= Fountain of Sant'Andrea della Valle =

Fountain in Rome, Italy

- Fontana di piazza Sant'Andrea della Valle (Italian)
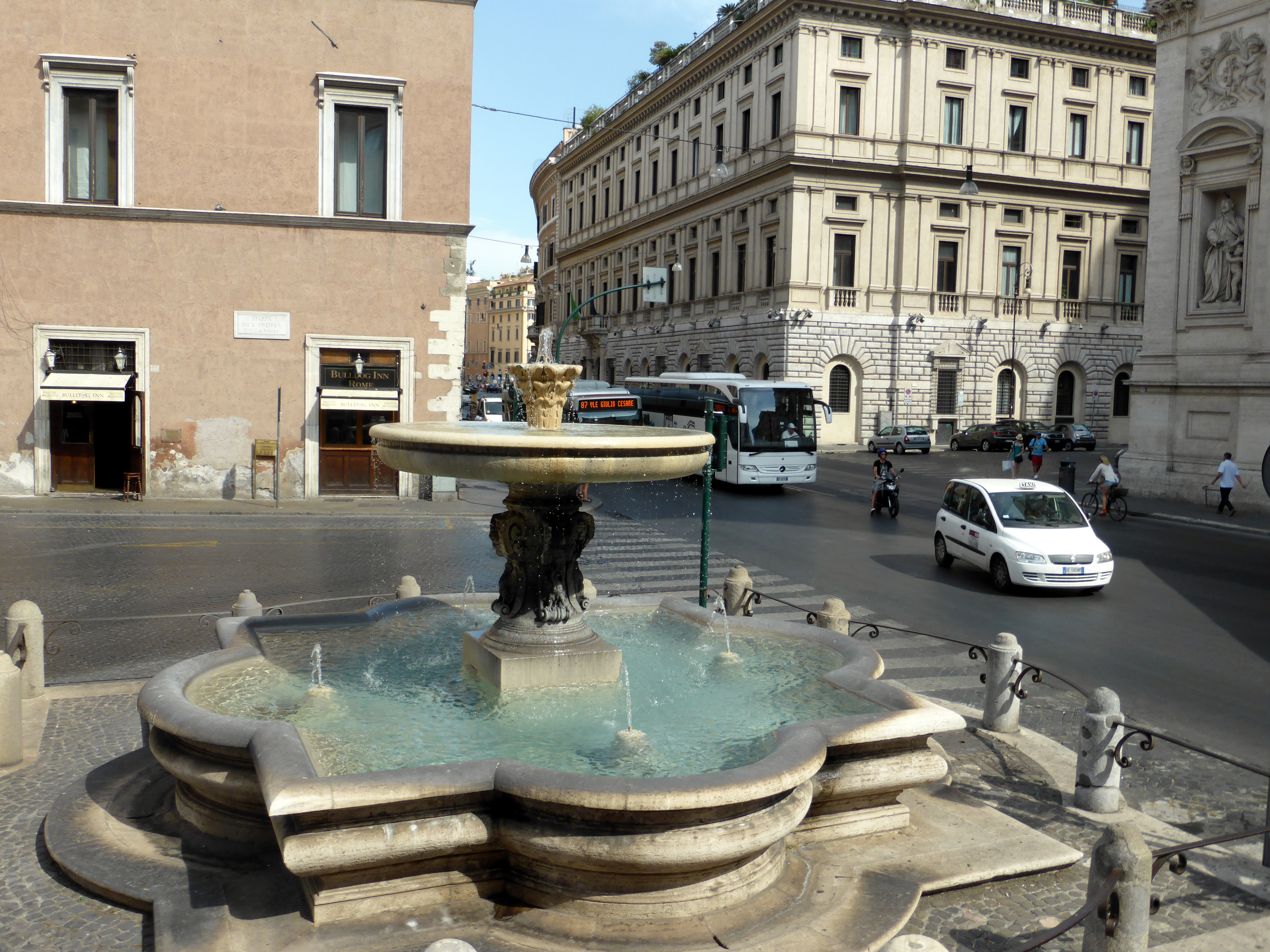
- The fountain in 2013
- Medium: Marble, concrete, and granite public fountain
- Movement: Baroque
- Location: Piazza di Sant'Andrea della Valle, Rome
- Owner: Municipality of Rome

The Fountain of Sant'Andrea della Valle is installed in Rome, Italy.

== See also ==
- List of fountains in Rome
