= Fontana di Piazza Colonna =

Fountain in Rome, Italy

- Fountain
- {{{other_names}}}
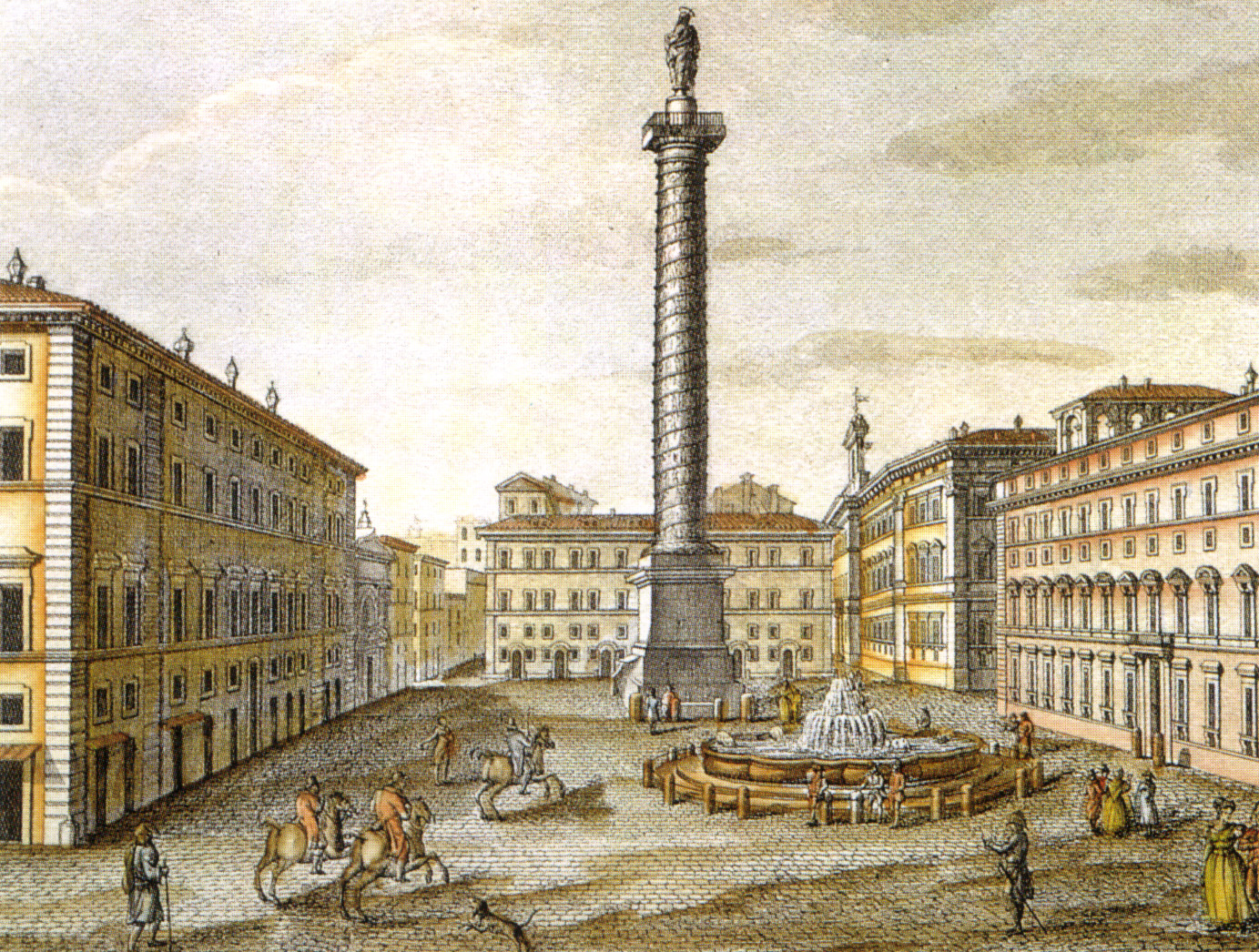
- 19th century print of the fountain in the Piazza Colonna
- Design: Giacomo Della Porta
- Location: Rome
- Interactive map of Fontana di Piazza Colonna
- Coordinates: 41°54′03″N 12°28′49″E

The fountain in the Piazza Colonna is a fountain in Rome, Italy, designed by the architect Giacomo Della Porta and constructed by the Fiesole sculptor Rocco Rossi between 1575 and 1577.

The fountain was one of a group of sixteen fountains built by Della Porta following the reconstruction of the Acqua Vergine aqueduct, a project begun by Pope Pius IV in 1561 and finished by Pope Pius V in 1570. The fountain itself was built under Pope Gregory XIII, best known for creating the Gregorian calendar. Like the other Roman fountains of its time, it was built to provide clean drinking water to the Roman residents, who before then had to drink the polluted water of the Tiber River. Also like the other fountains of its time, it operated purely by gravity; the source of the water was higher than the fountain itself, causing the water to spout into the air.

The water for the fountain first arrived at the old Trevi Fountain, then went to two reservoirs at the foot of the butte of San Sebastiancello, then through a series of the channels to the corner of via Condotti and the via del Corso, to Piazza Venezia, to the foot of the column of Marcus Aurelius. The source of the water for the fountain of Piazza Colonna was only 67 feet above sea level; like the Trevi Fountain, the Fontana della Barcaccia, and the fountains of Piazza Navona, all connected to the Acqua Vergine, the fountain of Piazza Colonna was unable to jet water high into the air.

The original project of Della Porta was to place an antique Roman statue of a sea god, called Marforio, in the fountain, against a background of a rocky grotto, behind which the column of Marcus Aurelius would be seen. The final fountain was simpler: the octagonal basin of the fountain was made of pink marble from the island of Chios in Greece, the same marble that Della Porta used for frame of the doorway of St. Peter's Basilica. Della Porta also designed the sixteen carved lion heads around the basin. A circular stone vasque was placed on a pedestal in the center, and water poured from this vasque into the basin.

The fountain was slightly restored by Bernini during the pontificate of Pope Alexander VII. In 1702 Pope Clement XI placed his own coat of arms, a star with eight points, on top of the original vasque in the center, but this was removed after his death.

In 1830 the architect Alessandro Stocchi removed the original central vasque and replaced it with the current vasque, made of white marble. He also added two groups of sculptures of dolphins, their tails wrapped around seashells, spouting water from their mouths, at either end of the basin.

== See also ==
- Fountains in Rome
- List of fountains in Rome

== Sources ==
- Maurizia Tazartes, Fontaines de Rome, translated from Italian into French by Christine PIot. Citadelles and Mazenot, Paris, 2004.
- Marilyn Symmes, Fountains- Splash and Spectacle. Water and Design from the Renaissance to the Present. Thames and Hudson and the Cooper-Hewitt National Design Museum, Smithsonian Institution. 1998.
- D'Onofrio, Cesare, Le Fontane di Roma, con documenti e disegni inediti, 2nd edition, Rome, 1962

Preceded by Fontana di Piazza d'Aracoeli	Landmarks of Rome; Fontana di Piazza Colonna	Succeeded by Fontane di Piazza Farnese
