= Fountains of St. Peter's Square =

Fountains in Vatican City

Coordinates: 41.9028°N 12.4573°E

The Fountains of St. Peter's Square (Italian: Fontane di Piazza San Pietro) are two fountains in St. Peter's Square in Vatican City, created by Carlo Maderno (1612–1614) and Gian Lorenzo Bernini (1667–1677) to ornament the square in front of St. Peter's Basilica. The older fountain, by Maderno, is on the north side of the square.

== Pope Innocent VIII fountain ==
The Maderno fountain on the north side of the square is located on the site of an earlier fountain, built in 1490 during the time of Pope Innocent VIII. It was reputed to be the finest fountain in Rome, with two vasques and three jets of water coming from the mouths of three stone heads, and three coats of arms of Pope Innocent VIII, carved by Alonso du Capua. The fountain was described by the Roman chronicler Stefano Infessura: "In the year 1490, His Holiness constructed on the Square of St. Peter ... a magnificent fountain, with marble plaques inscribed with history, and two round vasques one above the other, so that they can be seen; and anyone will judge, nothing comparable can be found anywhere in Italy." The fountain was restored by Pope Alexander VI in 1500 and a watering basin for animals was added.

== Maderno fountain ==
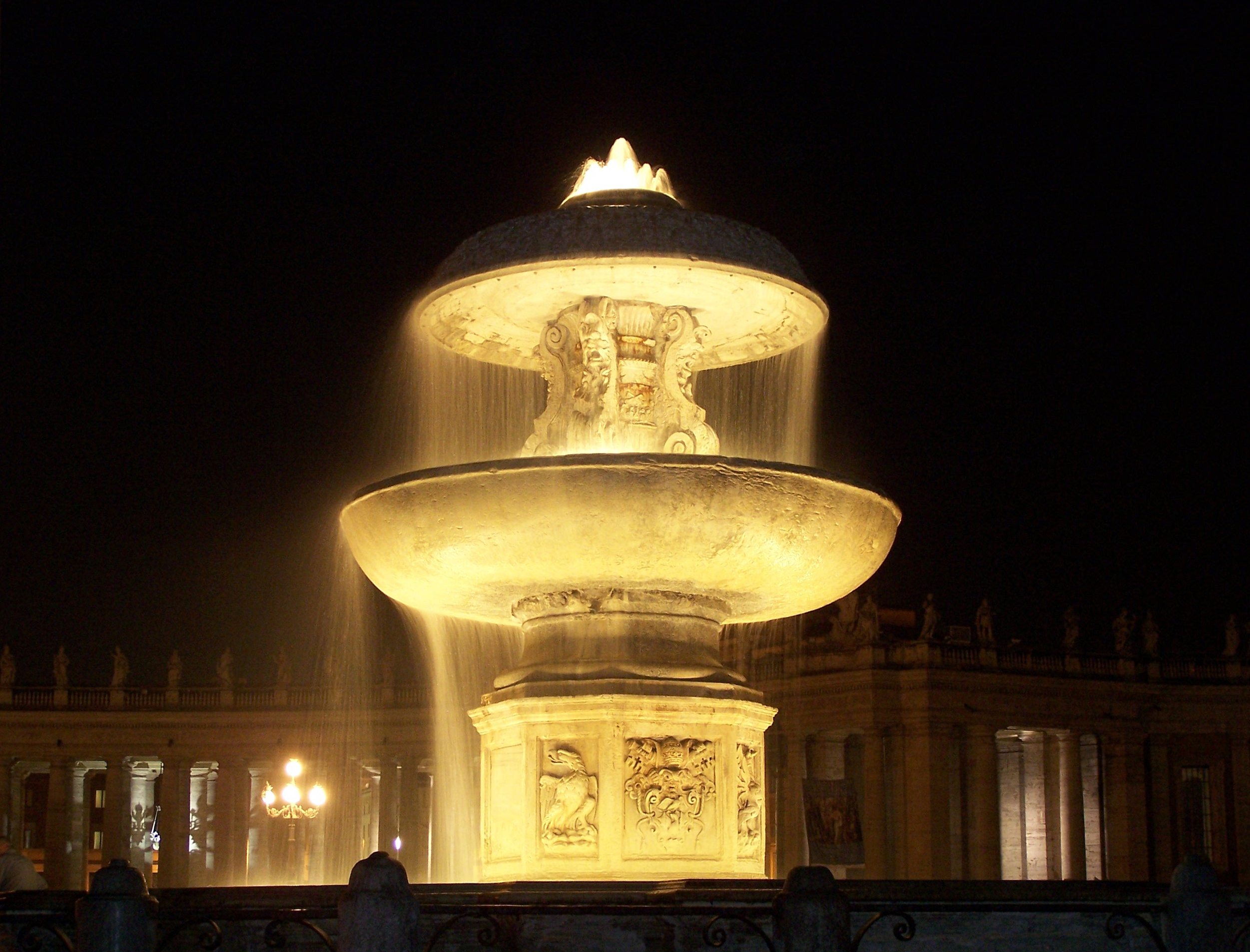
Fountain of St. Peter's Square by Carlo Maderno

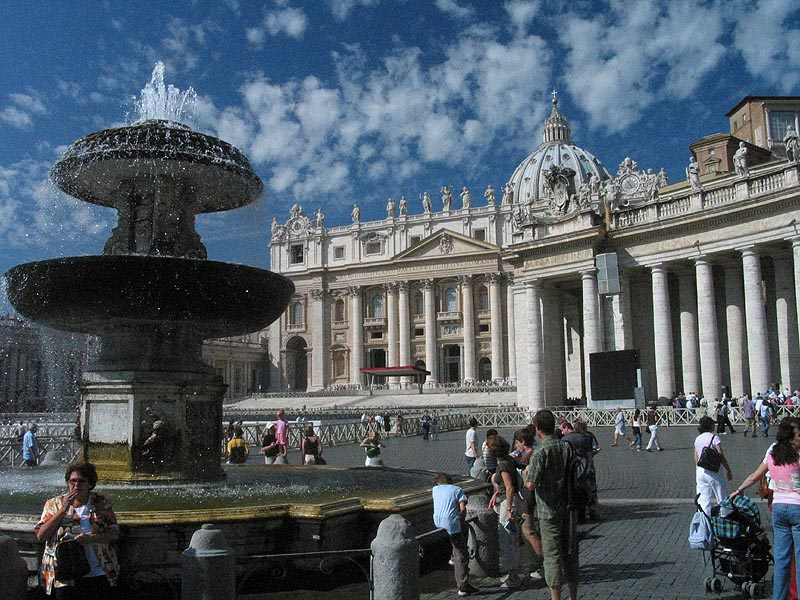
Fountain of St. Peter's Square by Carlo Maderno (1612–1614)

In 1612, the ancient Roman aqueduct the Aqua Traiana was rebuilt by Pope Paul V and renamed the Acqua Paola; the restored aqueduct provided the fountain with a much more abundant source of water. The architect Carlo Maderno, nephew of the architect Domenico Fontana, was given the commission to redesign the fountain. He built a new octagonal base for the fountain on top of which he built a large irregular basin, decorated with steps and small columns, to hold the water. He kept the large lower stone vasque of the old fountain, and ornamented the pedestal above it with four stone scrolls. He removed the smaller upper vasque, and replaced it with an inverted vasque or cap like a mushroom, covered with stone scales. When the water spouted from the top, it poured down over the top of the upper vasque, its flow broken and made to sparkle by the stone scales. In addition, he removed the coats of arms of the three previous Popes and replaced them with plaques honoring his patron, Pope Paul V.

Like all fountains of the time, the fountain on St. Peter's Square had no pumps and operated purely by gravity, with a source of water higher than the fountain which caused the water to shoot upwards. The source of water for the fountain, the Aqua Paola, was on the Janiculum hill, 266 above sea level, which meant that the fountain could shoot water twenty feet upwards into the air. In 1641, the Flemish lawyer Theodor Ameyden said that the jet of water from the top of the fountain "seemed to rise in the air like a veritable river." He called it "the most beautiful fountain which exists in Europe".

== Bernini fountain ==
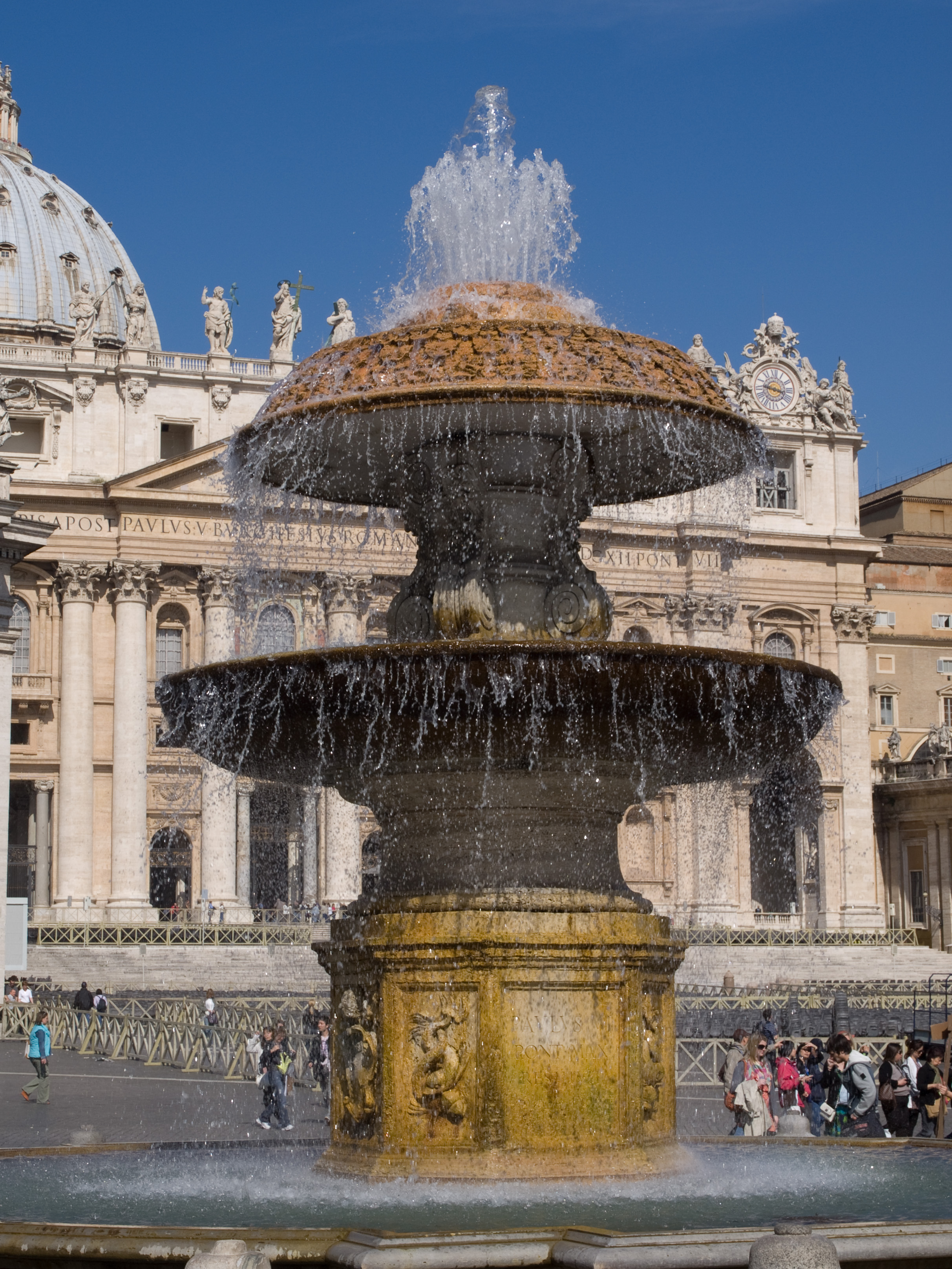
Fountain of St. Peter's Square by Gian Lorenzo Bernini (1667–1677)

For half a century, the square was decorated with the Maderno fountain and with the obelisk raised by Pope Sixtus V, but the southern part of the square remained empty. In 1667, Pope Clement X commissioned Gian Lorenzo Bernini to build a second fountain, which closely followed the design of the Maderno fountain. The Bernini fountain was completed in 1677.

== Influence ==
The Fountains of St. Peter's Square influenced other fountains throughout Europe. The Roman fountain at Peterhof in Russia (1720) was inspired by the Maderno fountain, and took its name from it. The Fontaines de la Concorde in the Place de la Concorde in Paris (1840), by Jacques-Ignace Hittorff, were also strongly influenced by the Maderno fountain and the arrangement of the fountains and obelisk in St. Peter's Square.

== See also ==
- Index of Vatican City-related articles
- List of works by Gian Lorenzo Bernini
