= List of public art in Rome =

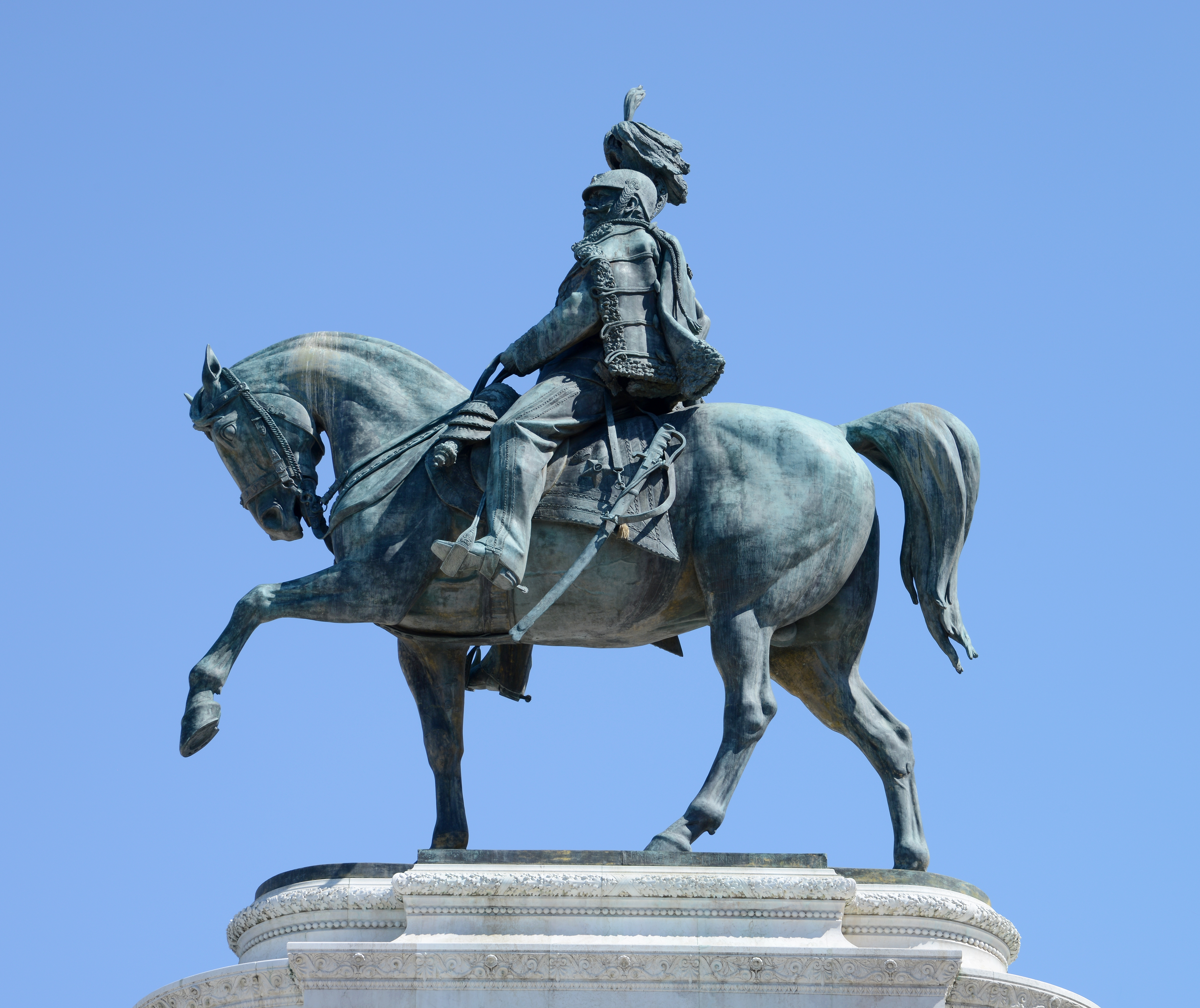
Equestrian statue of Victor Emmanuel II

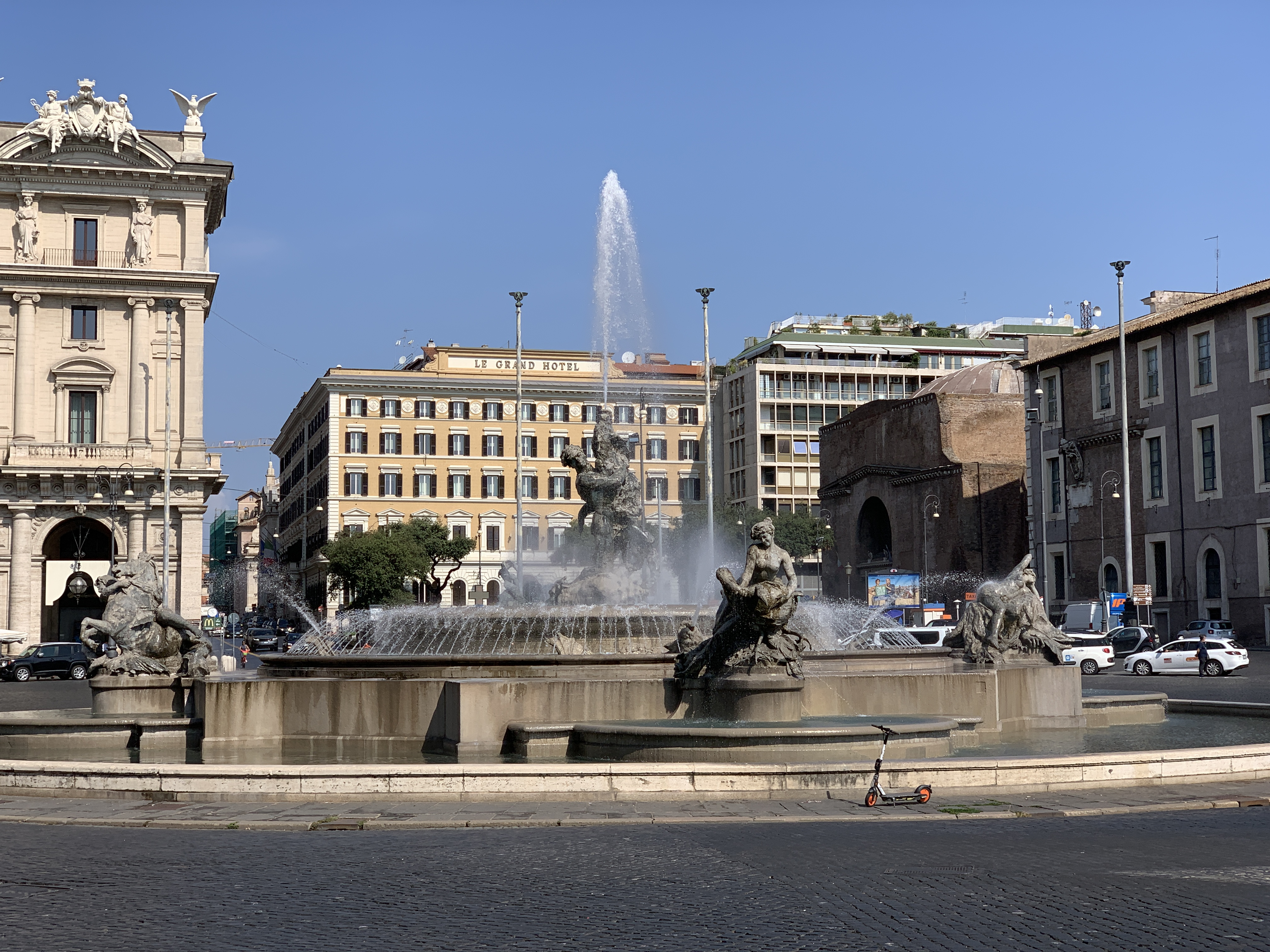
Fountain of the Naiads

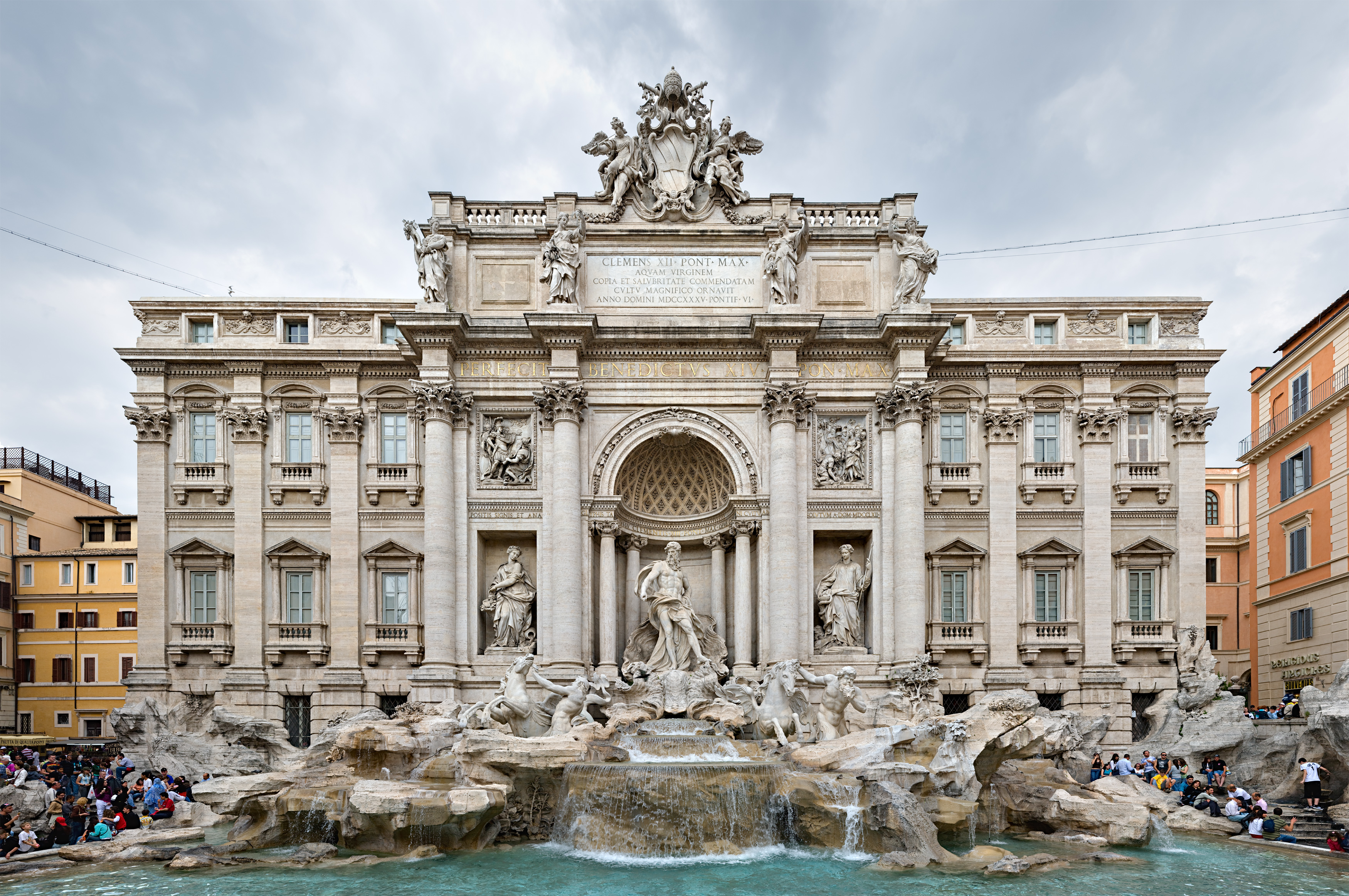
Trevi Fountain

Following is a list of notable artwork in Rome Italy:

- Angel of Grief
- Monument to Giordano Bruno
- Monument to Cola di Rienzo
- Column of the Immaculate Conception
- Equestrian statue of Charles Albert of Sardinia
- Equestrian statue of Marcus Aurelius
- Equestrian statue of Victor Emmanuel II
- Fontana dei Dioscuri
- Fontana dell'Acqua Felice
- Fountain of the Naiads
- Horse Tamers
- Monument to John Paul II
- Monument to Terenzio Mamiani
- Monument to Giacomo Matteotti
- Monument to Pietro Metastasio
- Monument to Marco Minghetti
- Monument to the Cairoli Brothers
- Monument to Nicola Spedalieri
- Statue of Augustus
- Statue of Francis of Assisi
- Statue of Julius Caesar
- Statue of Nerva
- Statue of Trajan
- Talking statues
  - Abbot Luigi
  - Babuino
  - Il Facchino
  - Madama Lucrezia
  - Marforio
  - Pasquino
- Trevi Fountain

== See also ==
- List of public art in Milan
- List of public art in Venice
