= Acqua Vergine =

Roman aqueduct in Rome, Italy

Coordinates: 41°54′10″N 12°29′02″E

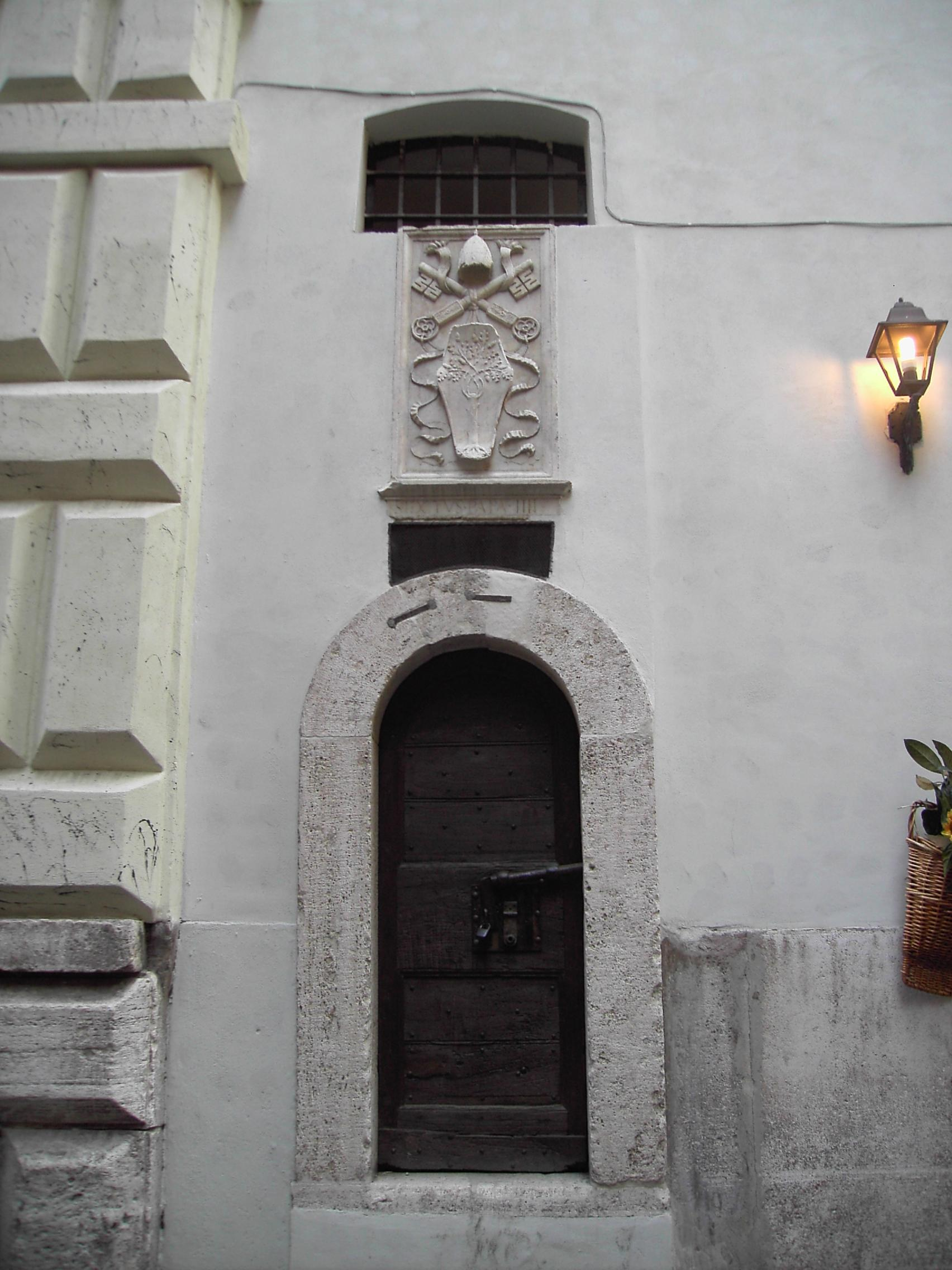
The still-functioning entrance to the inspection duct of the Acqua Vergine, at Via del Nazareno.

The Acqua Vergine is one of several Roman aqueducts that deliver pure drinking water to Rome. Its name derives from its predecessor Aqua Virgo, which was constructed by Marcus Vipsanius Agrippa in 19 BC. Its terminal castellum is located at the Baths of Agrippa, and it served the vicinity of Campus Martius through its various conduits. In an effort to restore fresh water to Rome during the Renaissance, Pope Nicholas V, in 1453, renovated the main channels of the Aqua Virgo and added numerous secondary conduits under Campo Marzio. The original terminus, called a mostra, which means showpiece, was the stately, dignified wall fountain designed by Leon Battista Alberti in Piazza dei Crociferi. Due to several additions and modifications to the end-most points of the conduits during the years that followed, during the Renaissance and Baroque periods, the Acqua Vergine culminated in several magnificent mostre - the Trevi Fountain and the fountains of Piazza del Popolo.

== Courses ==
Beginning as rainwater falling on the Alban Hills to the east of Rome, then percolating through miles of volcanic tuff, the water springs forth in marshland approximately eight miles to the east of Rome off Via Collatina in a small town called Salone. From the same source, but running different courses, two separate aqueducts emerge:

- Acqua Vergine Antica, which travels underground through some of the same channels constructed by Agrippa's engineers, proceeds into Rome on the northeast under Via di Pietralata, at a point formerly called Fosso Pietralata, crosses Via Nomentana, flows westward toward and through the park of Villa Ada, passes under the western limits of the Villa Borghese, traverses the gardens of Villa Medici, descends the Pincio to Piazza di Spagna, extends under Renaissance Rome to burst forth into the Roman sky in the spectacular, baroque mostra on the Quirinal Hill, the fountain of Trevi.
- Acqua Vergine Nuova, which travels into Rome from the northeast under Via Tiburtina, flows under the Pincio to Porta Pinciana, where it branches into 2 channels:
  - one passes southwest to link up, but not mingle, with Acqua Vergine Antica just behind Piazza di Spagna and descends the Pincio to emit its water through the fine, elegant sprays of its regal mostra, the lions of Piazza del Popolo
  - one passes northwest under Galoppatoio, curves through the Borghese Gardens, makes a sharp southerly turn toward Piazzale Flaminio to make its triumphant appearance in the triple-arch mostra cascading on the western slopes of the Pincio overlooking Piazza del Popolo.

== Termini ==
Today, as in days of old, the Acqua Vergine is regarded as furnishing some of the purest drinking-water in Rome, reputed for its restorative qualities. Many people to this day can be seen filling containers for drinking and cooking in its fountains, including:

- Trevi Fountain
- The fountains of Piazza del Popolo
  - The Cascade on the Pincio
  - The Lions of the central fountain
  - The Rome Group
- The Pantheon fountain in Piazza della Rotonda
- The Colonna fountain in Piazza Colonna
- The Fontana delle Tartarughe in Piazza Mattei
- The fountain of Campo de' Fiori
- The north and south fountains of Piazza Navona
  - The Neptune Fountain
  - The Moor fountain
- The fountains of Piazza Venezia
- Il Facchino (The Porter) in Via Lata
- Fontana della Barcaccia in Piazza di Spagna
- Il Babuino (The Baboon) in Via del Babuino.
