= Abbot Luigi =

One of the six talking statues of Rome

- Abbate Luiggi (Italian)
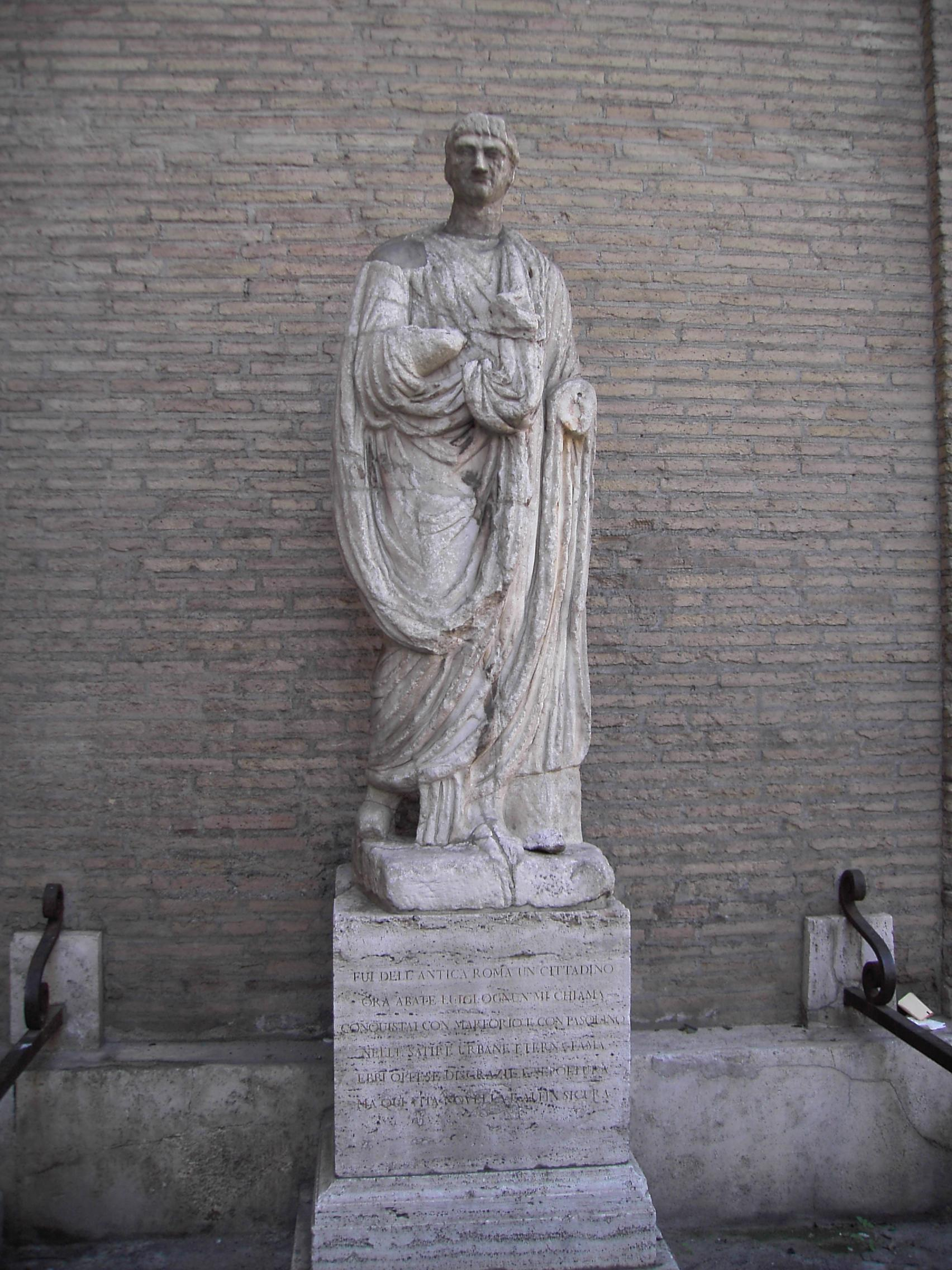
- Type: Talking statues of Rome
- Subject: An unknown Roman magistrate Named for an abbot from Chiesa del Sudario
- Location: Piazza Vidoni; 41.896056°N 12.474556°E

Abbot Luigi (Romanesco: Abbate Luiggi; Italian: Abate Luigi) is one of the talking statues of Rome. Like the other five "talking statues", pasquinades – irreverent satires poking fun at public figures – were posted beside Abate Luigi.

The statue is a late Roman sculpture of a standing man in a toga, probably a senior magistrate. It was found during the excavations for the foundations of the Palazzo Vidoni-Caffarelli, near the Theatre of Pompey. After being moved to various locations in Rome, the statue has been situated in the piazza Vidoni since 1924, near its place of discovery, on a side wall of the Basilica di Sant'Andrea della Valle. Its head has been removed in jest several times.

The original identity of the person depicted has not been determined, and it was named after a clergyman from the nearby chiesa del Sudario.

An inscription on its plinth testifies to Abate Luigi's loquacity:

FUI DELL’ANTICA ROMA UN CITTADINO
ORA ABATE LUIGI OGNUN MI CHIAMA
CONQUISTAI CON MARFORIO E CON PASQUINO
NELLE SATIRE URBANE ETERNA FAMA
EBBI OFFESE, DISGRAZIE E SEPOLTURA
MA QUI VITA NOVELLA E ALFIN SICURA

I was a citizen of Ancient Rome
Now all call me Abbot Louis
Along with Marforio and Pasquino I conquer
Eternal fame for Urban Satire
I received offences, disgrace, and burial,
till here I found new life and finally safety

== See also ==
- The Scior Carera in Milan.

== Sources ==
- Rendina, C., "Pasquino statua parlante”, ROMA ieri, oggi, domani, n. 20 – febbraio 1990
