= Statue of Francis of Assisi =

Statue of Francis of Assisi may refer to:

- Statue of Francis of Assisi, Charles Bridge, Prague, Czech Republic
- Statue of Francis of Assisi (Puerto Vallarta), Jalisco, Mexico
- Statue of Francis of Assisi, Rome, Italy
