= Madama Lucrezia =

One of the six talking statues of Rome

- Madama Lugrezzia
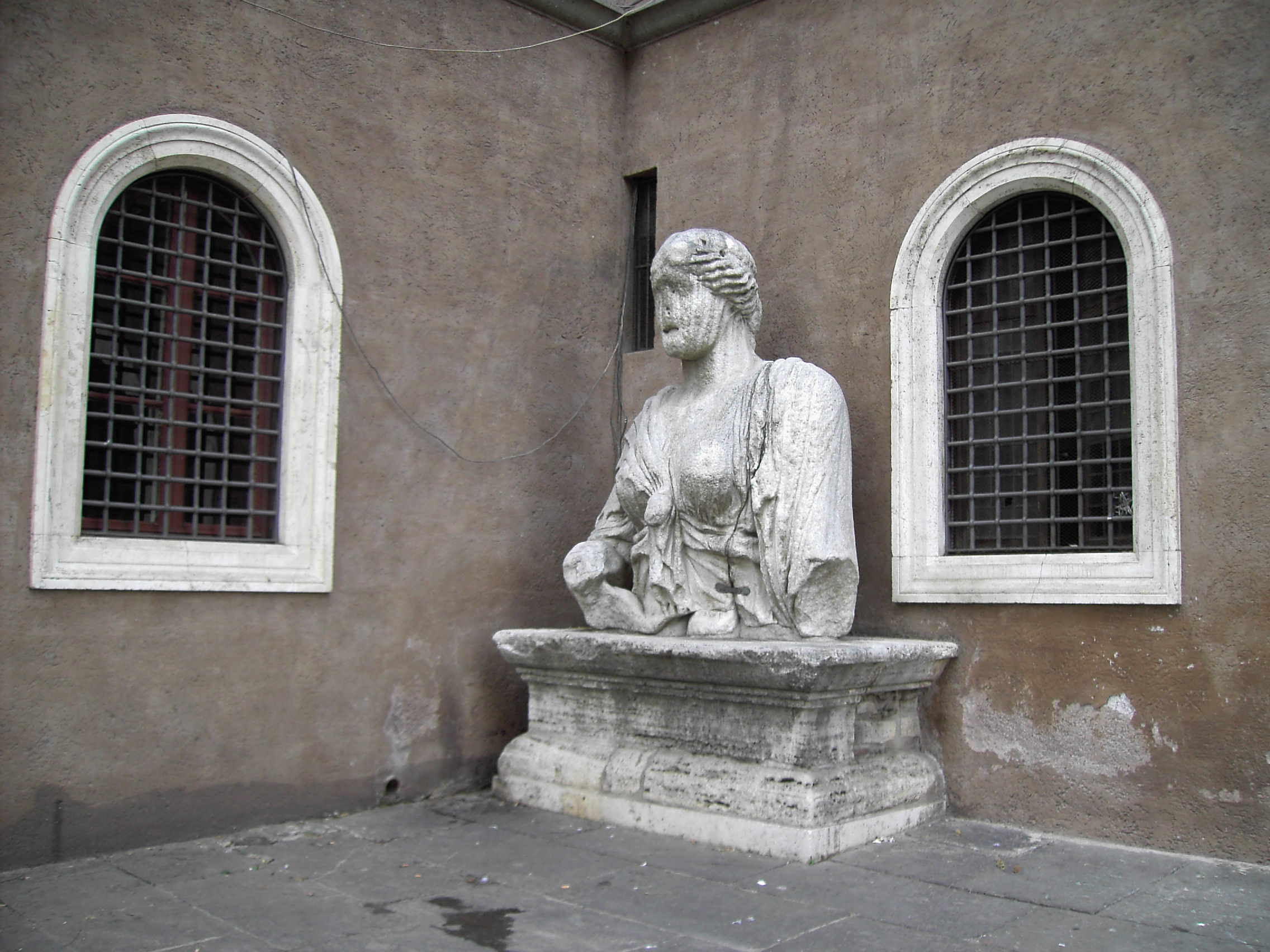
- Type: Talking statues of Rome
- Subject: Probably Isis or one of her priestesses Named for Lucrezia d'Alagno, who once owned the statue
- Location: Piazza di San Marco; 41°53′45″N 12°28′54″E

Madama Lucrezia (Romanesco: Madama Lugrezzia) is one of the six "talking statues" of Rome. Pasquinades — irreverent satires poking fun at public figures — were posted beside each of the statues from the 16th century onwards, written as if spoken by the statue, largely in answer to the verses posted at the sculpture called "Pasquino". Madama Lucrezia was the only female "talking statue", and was the subject of competing verses by Pasquino and Marforio.

Madama Lucrezia is a colossal Roman bust, about 3 metres high, sited on a plinth in the corner of a piazza between the Palazzo Venezia and the basilica of St. Mark. The statue is badly disfigured, and the original subject cannot be identified with certainty, but may represent the Egyptian goddess Isis (or of a priestess of Isis), or perhaps a portrait of the Roman empress Faustina. The bust was given to Lucrezia d'Alagno, the lover of Alfonso d'Aragona, King of Naples; she moved to Rome after Alfonso's death in 1458.

== See also ==
- The Scior Carera in Milan.

== Bibliography ==
- C. Rendina, ”Pasquino statua parlante”, in Roma ieri, oggi, domani, n. 20, February 1990.

Further bibliography is at Pasquino.
