= Giacomo Mazzocchi =

Italian humanist, printer and bookseller

Giacomo Mazzocchi, in Latin on his titlepages Jacobus Mazochius, (active 1505 — 1527) was a learned bookseller, printer, and noted antiquarian in papal Rome during the High Renaissance. A native of Bergamo, Mazzocchi is first heard of in 1505 as provider of finance for an edition of Vibius Sequester De fluminibus printed by J. Besicken of Rome. By 1509 Mazzocchi was himself in business as a printer. For humanists he might publish such scholarly works as the first printed repertory of Roman inscriptions, Epigrammata Antiquae Urbis (April 1521), a folio of some 3,000 inscriptions, mostly of epitaphs, in which his collaborator was the Florentine priest Francesco Albertini This work includes inscriptions ranging from Roman Republican times to the age of Justinian I and is illustrated with somewhat stylised woodcuts showing some of the buildings and monuments of Rome, such as the Pantheon, the Arch of Constantine and the Pyramid of Cestius.

Mazzocchi's other books include Latin translations of Greek texts, among them Byzantine authors little known at the time such as the historians Procopius and Agathias. For even more limited circulation he published ephemera that have become bibliographical rarities, but that show him as a trusted printer for the inner circle of Roman humanists: a tract on Roman calendars (1509), a letter on sculptures in the Cortile del Belvedere by the nephew of the famous Pico della Mirandola (1513), or twelve panegyrics composed by Petrus Franciscus Justulus of Spoleto, honouring the Papal nephew Cesare Borgia (1510).

At the same time, under the title Carmina Apposita Pasquino, Mazzocchi published annual collections of satirical pasquinades that were circulating in Rome, which had been applied furtively by night to the Pasquino or other talking statues of Rome. Presumably Mazzocchi omitted any of these that were too critical of the Pope or the curia, for Mazzocchi, under papal privilege, also published many papal bullae including those of the Fifth Lateran Council, 1512.

Mazzocchi's scholarly standing was high enough for him to be appointed, in 1515, one of the Papal Commissioners for Antiquities alongside the artist Raphael and the scholars Marco Fabio Calvo and Andrea Fulvio.

Typographically Mazzocchi's work is of interest for his very early use of a large-format upper-case roman typeface for title-pages, headings and other prominent lines. This is present in the Epigrammata but existed at least as early as 1513. Early printers in roman type generally set titles and headings in the same size and style as the text, and it was mainly German-speaking printers such as Johann Froben who developed the use of display-sized fonts from about 1516 onwards, so that Mazzocchi's type may well have been the first of its kind.

He disappeared during the Sack of Rome (1527) and nothing subsequent is known of him.
