= Fontana della Barcaccia =

Fountain in Rome

- Fountain
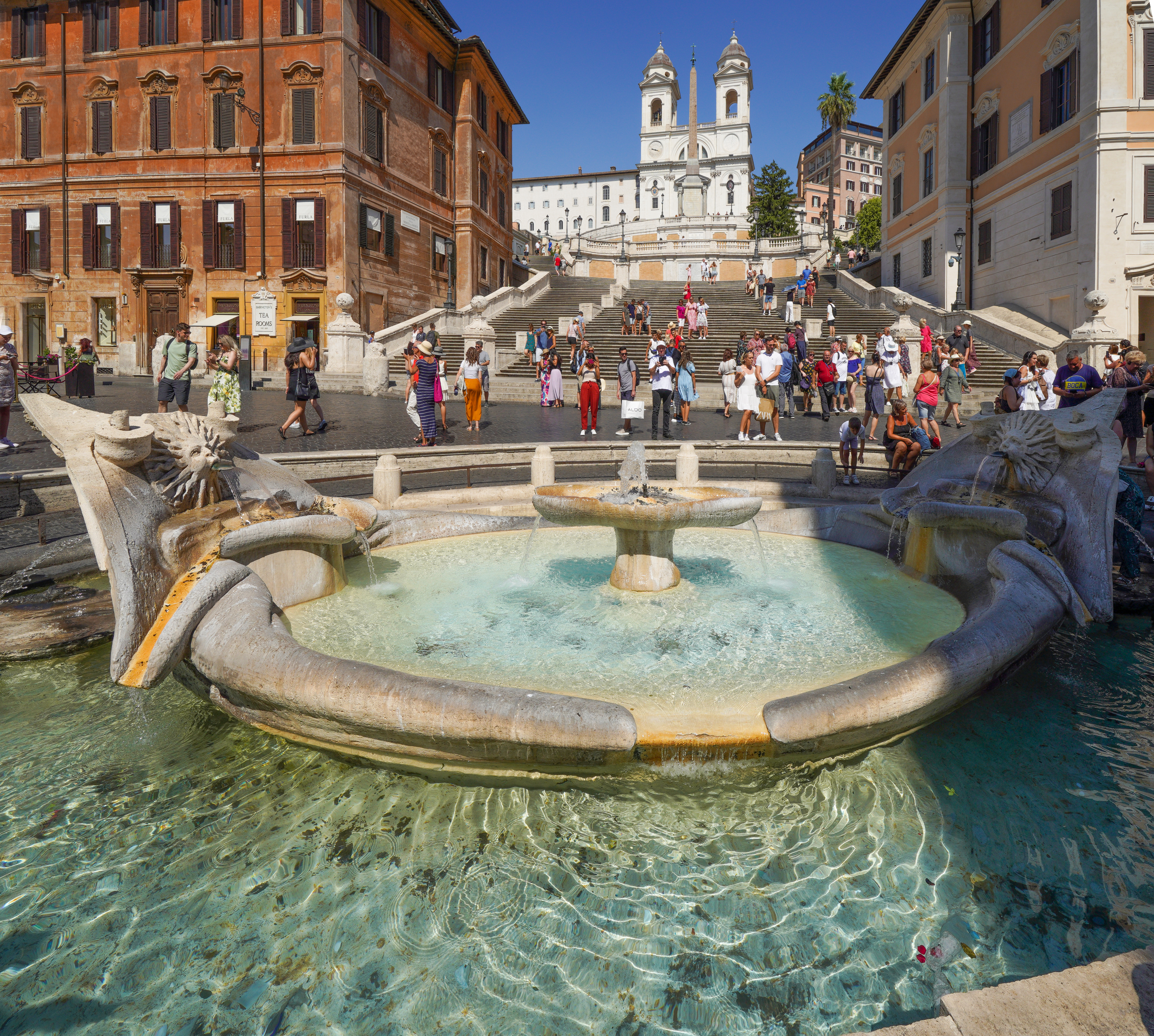
- Fontana della Barcaccia in Piazza di Spagna, Rome
- Design: Pietro Bernini
- Location: Piazza di Spagna, Rome, Italy
- Interactive map of Fontana della Barcaccia
- Coordinates: 41°54′21″N 12°28′56″E

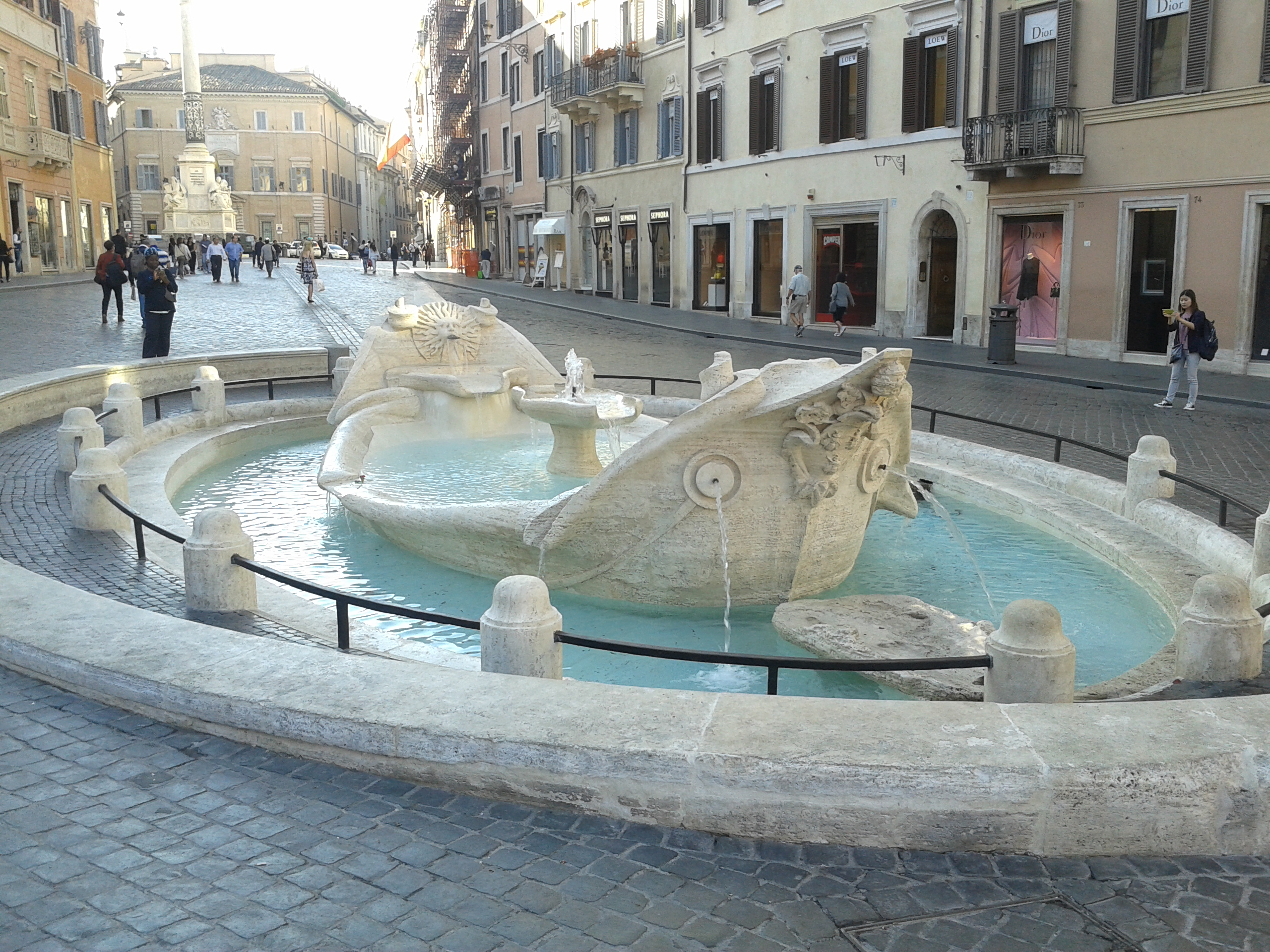
The Barcaccia Fountain immediately after its 2014 restoration, viewed toward the adjacent Piazza Mignanelli.

The Fontana della Barcaccia (Italian: [barˈkattʃa]; "Fountain of the Boat") is a Baroque-style fountain found at the foot of the Spanish Steps in Rome's Piazza di Spagna (Spanish Square). Pope Urban VIII commissioned Pietro Bernini in 1623 to build the fountain as part of a prior Papal project to erect a fountain in every major piazza in Rome. The fountain was completed between 1627 and 1629 by Pietro possibly along with the help of his son Gian Lorenzo Bernini, especially after his father's death on August 29, 1629.

== Description ==
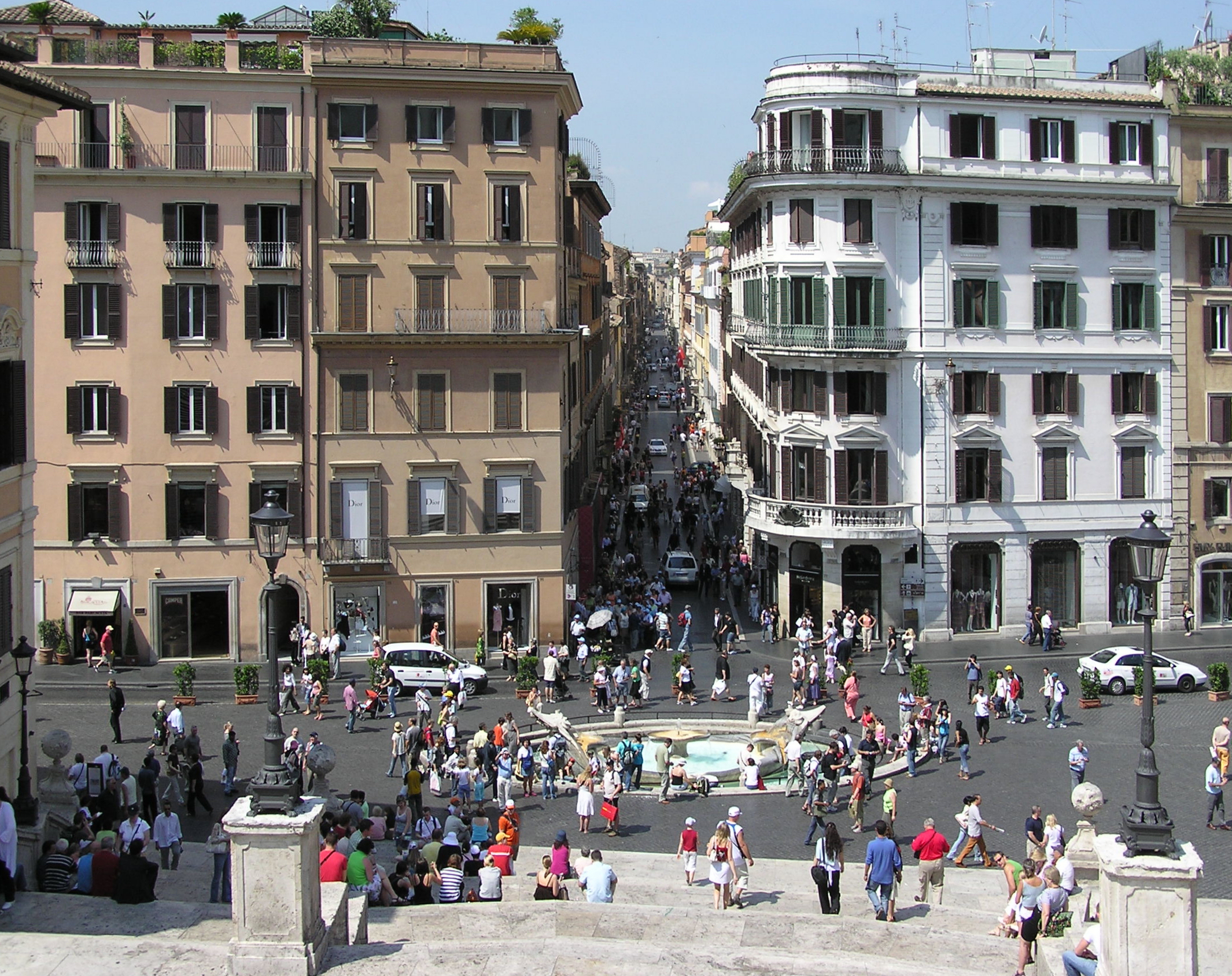
Fontana della Barcaccia, seen from the top of the Spanish Steps.

The sculptural fountain is made into the shape of a half-sunken ship with water overflowing its sides into a small basin. The source of the water comes from the Acqua Vergine, an aqueduct from 19 BCE. Bernini built this fountain to be slightly below street level due to the low water pressure from the aqueduct. Water flows from seven points of fountain: the center baluster; two inside the boat from sun-shaped human faces; and four outside the boat.

According to legend, as the River Tiber flooded in 1598, water carried a small boat into the Piazza di Spagna. When the water receded, a boat was deposited in the center of the square, and it was this event that inspired Bernini's creation. The fountain is decorated with the papal coat of arms of the Barberini family as a reminder of Pope Urban VIII's ancestry.

== Damage and restoration ==
On May 15, 2007 four drunken tourists damaged the monumental fountain with a large screwdriver, inflicting a deep scratch and the detachment of a significant part of the papal coat of arms. The carabinieri who rushed to the place were attacked by the four vandals, but still managed to get them under arrest and prevent further damage.

Restoration on the fountain has been carried out several times, the last being in 2014, through a private donation of €209,960. A few weeks after the unveiling, the fountain was damaged on 19 February 2015 by a group of Dutch football hooligans, who were in Rome to support Rotterdam-based club Feyenoord in a Europa League match against A.S. Roma. The group, allegedly under the influence of alcohol and drugs, stepped into the fountain and threw bottles and rubbish in it before clashing with the police.

== In popular culture ==
The English poet John Keats could hear the sound of the fountain's water flowing soothingly from his deathbed. He said it reminded him of lines from the 17th-century play Philaster, or Love Lies a-Bleeding (1611) and was the source for his epitaph: "Here lies one whose name was writ in water."

Jess Walter uses the fountain as a plot device in Beautiful Ruins.

== See also ==
- List of works by Gian Lorenzo Bernini

Preceded by Babuino	Landmarks of Rome; Fontana della Barcaccia	Succeeded by Il Facchino
