= Andrea Fulvio =

Italian Renaissance humanist, poet and antiquarian

- Born: c. 1470; Palestrina, Italy
- Died: 1527 (aged 56–57); Rome, Italy
- Occupation: Poet
- Writing career
- Language: Italian
- Genre: Poetry

Andrea Fulvio (in his Latin publications and correspondence Andreas Fulvius; c. 1470–1527) was an Italian Renaissance humanist, poet and antiquarian active in Rome, who advised Raphael in the reconstructions of ancient Rome as settings for his frescoes. Fulvio was Raphael's companion and cicerone as they explored the ruins, Fulvio showing Raphael what was essential to be drawn and ex temporising on them.

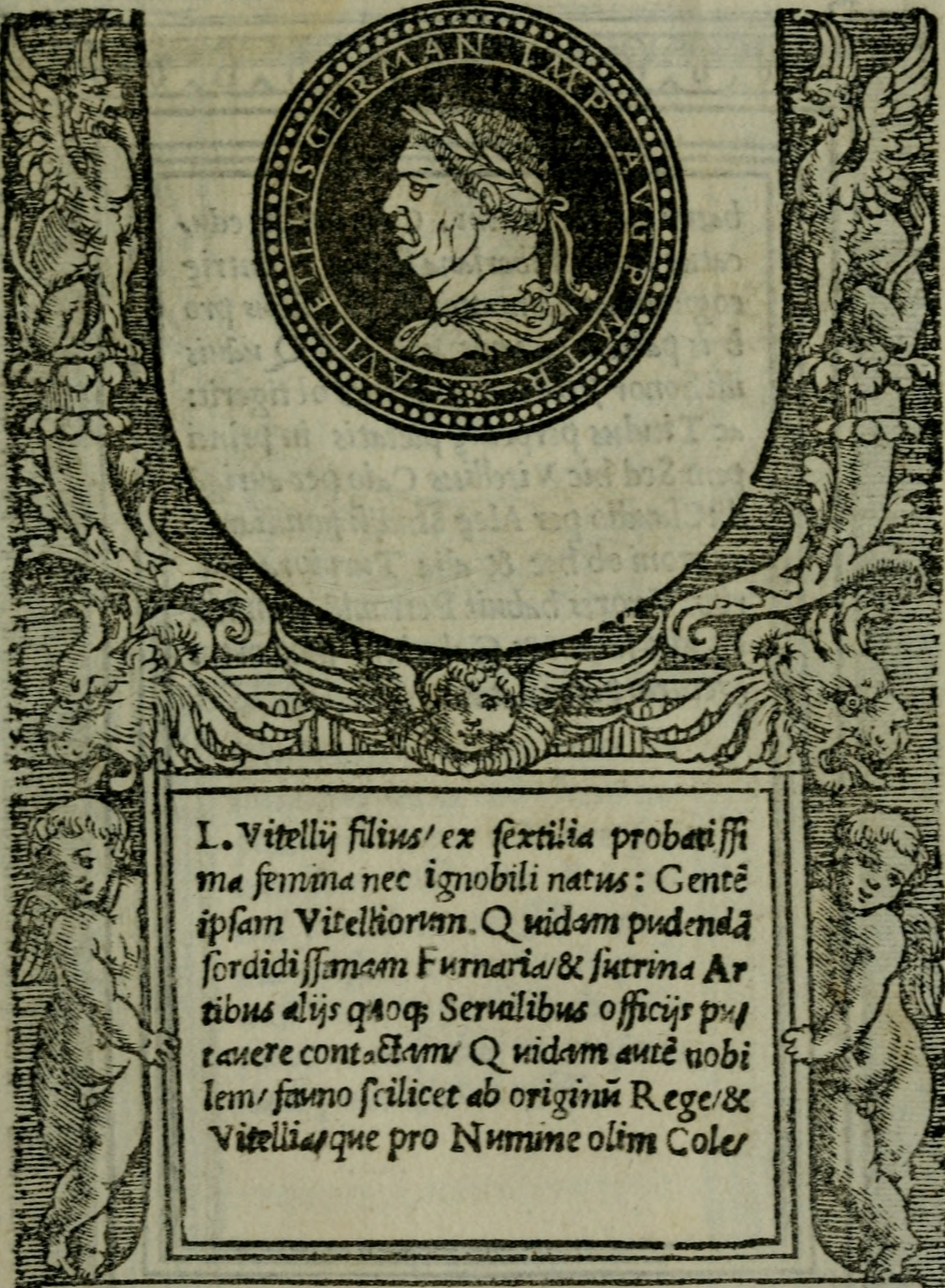
Illustrium imagines

Fulvio published two volumes. One contained the first attempts at identifying famous faces of Antiquity from numismatic evidence, his richly illustrated Illustrium imagines of 1517, the portrait heads possibly by Giovanni Battista Palumba. The other was a guide to the city's antiquities, Antiquitates Urbis, published in the disastrous year 1527. For a more popular market, his Antiquitates Urbis were translated into Italian by Paolo Del Rosso and published at Venice in 1543 with the title Opera delle antichità della città di Roma & delli edificij memorabili di quella. It proved so useful as a guidebook in Italian that it was updated by Girolamo Ferrucci and reprinted at Venice in 1588 with the title L'antichità di Roma di nuovo con ogni diligenza corretta & ampliata.

Antiquitates Urbis furnished more than a new guide to the antiquities of Rome seen by a humanist's critical eye, the first of a genre of antiquarian topographical studies that extends to our time. It also remarked upon the introduction of printing to Rome in the previous generation and identified a few collections, such as Angelo Colocci's antiquities in his villa beside the Aqua Virgo and Andrea Cardinal della Valle's Roman coins. Many of the astute observations recorded in Fulvio's Antiquitates Urbis have withstood time's tests: the half-lifesize Roman bronze Camillus, then known as the Zingara ("Gypsy Woman"), he first identified as a young serving lad, and the Marphurius he recognized as a reclining river god, a Roman iconographical type unknown to the previous generations of antiquarians. He remarked upon the pacifying gesture of the equestrian Marcus Aurelius.
