= Il Facchino =

One of the six talking statues of Rome

- The Porter
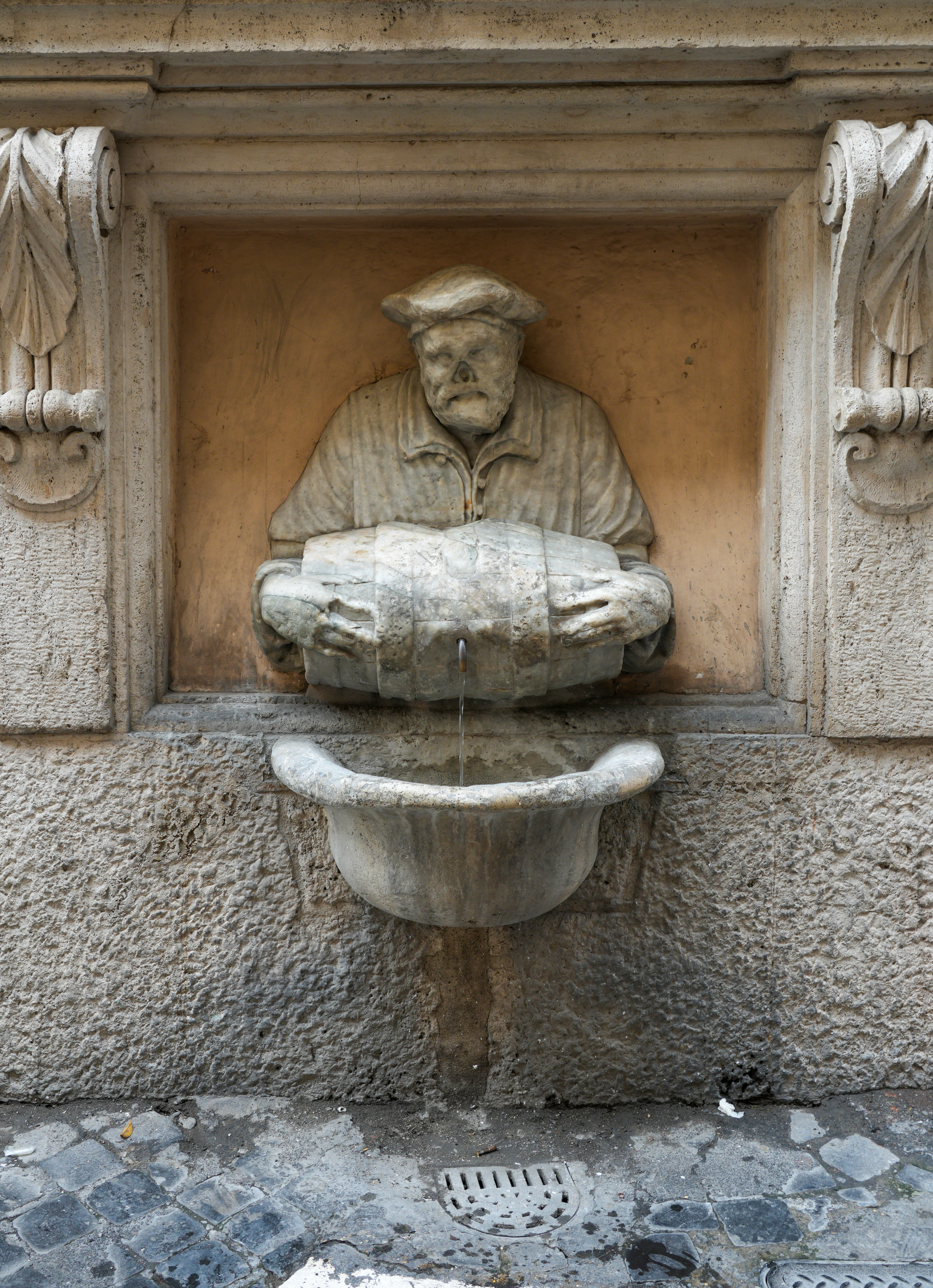
- Click on the map for a fullscreen view
- Year: c. 1580 (Jacopo del Conte)
- Type: Talking statues of Rome
- Location: Via Lata; 41°53′54″N 12°28′53″E

Il Facchino (Italian: Il Facchino, The Porter) is one of the talking statues of Rome. Like the other five "talking statues", pasquinades - irreverent satires poking fun at public figures - were posted beside Il Facchino.

Il Facchino was originally sited on the via del Corso, on the main facade of the Palazzo De Carolis Simonetti, near the piazza Venezia. In 1874, it was moved to its current position, to the side of the same building, now the Banco di Roma, on the Via Lata.

Unlike the other talking statues, which are all dated to Ancient Rome, Il Facchino is relatively modern. The statue was created in around 1580, to a design by Jacopo del Conte for the Corporazione degli Aquaroli. It depicts a man wearing a cap and a sleeved shirt, carrying a barrel - an "acquarolo", who would take water from the Tiber to sell on the streets of Rome during the period before, at the orders of the Popes, the Roman aqueducts were repaired and the public fountains played again. Water spouts from the bunghole creating a fountain. The man's face is badly damaged, the result of paving stones thrown at it over the years, in the popular misapprehension (because of the soft cap) that it portrayed Martin Luther.

== See also ==
- The Scior Carera in Milan.

== Bibliography ==
- Rendina, C., "Pasquino statua parlante", ROMA ieri, oggi, domani, n. 20 – febbraio 1990

Preceded by Fontana della Barcaccia	Landmarks of Rome; Il Facchino	Succeeded by Marforio
