= Marforio =

One of the six talking statues of Rome

Marphurius
- Marforio (Italian)
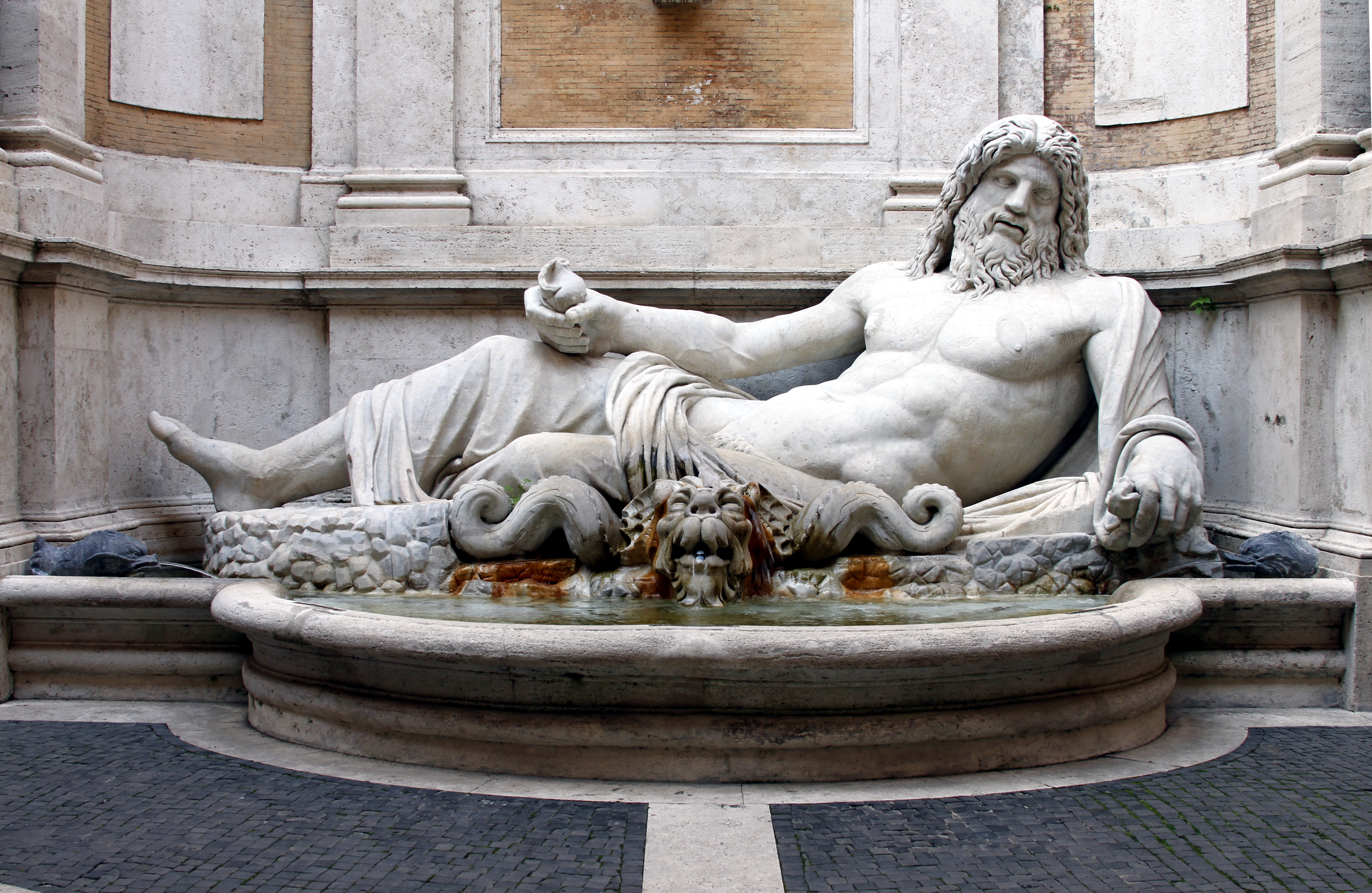
- Palazzo Nuovo - Musei Capitolini
- Click on the map for a fullscreen view
- Year: 1st century AD
- Type: Talking statues of Rome
- Subject: Oceanus; The name is a corruption of Latin mare in foro, "the sea in the forum" (inscribed near the statue's original location)
- Location: Palazzo Nuovo, Capitoline Museums; 41°53′37.50″N 12°28′59.77″E

Marphurius or Marforio (Italian: Marforio; Medieval Latin: Marphurius, Marforius) is one of the talking statues of Rome. Marforio maintained a friendly rivalry with the most famous talking statue, Pasquin. At the talking statues, pasquinades — irreverent satires poking fun at public figures — were posted in the 16th and 17th centuries.

== The statue and its location ==
Marforio is a large 1st century Roman marble sculpture of a reclining bearded river god or Oceanus, which in the past has been variously identified as a depiction of Jupiter, Neptune, or the Tiber. It was the humanist and antiquarian Andrea Fulvio who first identified it as a river god, in 1527. The Marfoi was a landmark in Rome from the late 12th century. Poggio Bracciolini wrote of it as one of the sculptures surviving from Antiquity, and in the early 16th century it was still near the Arch of Septimius Severus, where the various authors reported it.

The origin of its name is a matter of some debate. It was discovered with a granite basin bearing the inscription mare in foro, but may take its name from the Latin name for the area in which it was discovered (Martis Forum), or from the Marioli (or Marfuoli) family who owned property near the Mamertine Prison, also near the forum, where the statue was sat until 1588.

Pope Sixtus V had the statue moved to the Piazza San Marco, (in Rome) in 1588, and then to the piazza del Campidoglio in 1592, where it decorates a fountain designed by Giacomo della Porta on a wall of the Basilica di Santa Maria in Ara Coeli, facing the Palazzo dei Conservatori. Part of the face, the right foot, and the left hand holding a shell were restored in 1594. In 1645, the building of the Palazzo Nuovo enclosed the fountain in its courtyard.

== See also ==
- The Scior Carera in Milan.

== Bibliography ==
- Rendina, C., "Pasquino statua parlante”, ROMA ieri, oggi, domani, n. 20, February 1990.

Preceded by Il Facchino	Landmarks of Rome; Marforio	Succeeded by Fontana del Moro
