= Babuino =

One of the six talking statues of Rome

Il Babbuino
- The Baboon
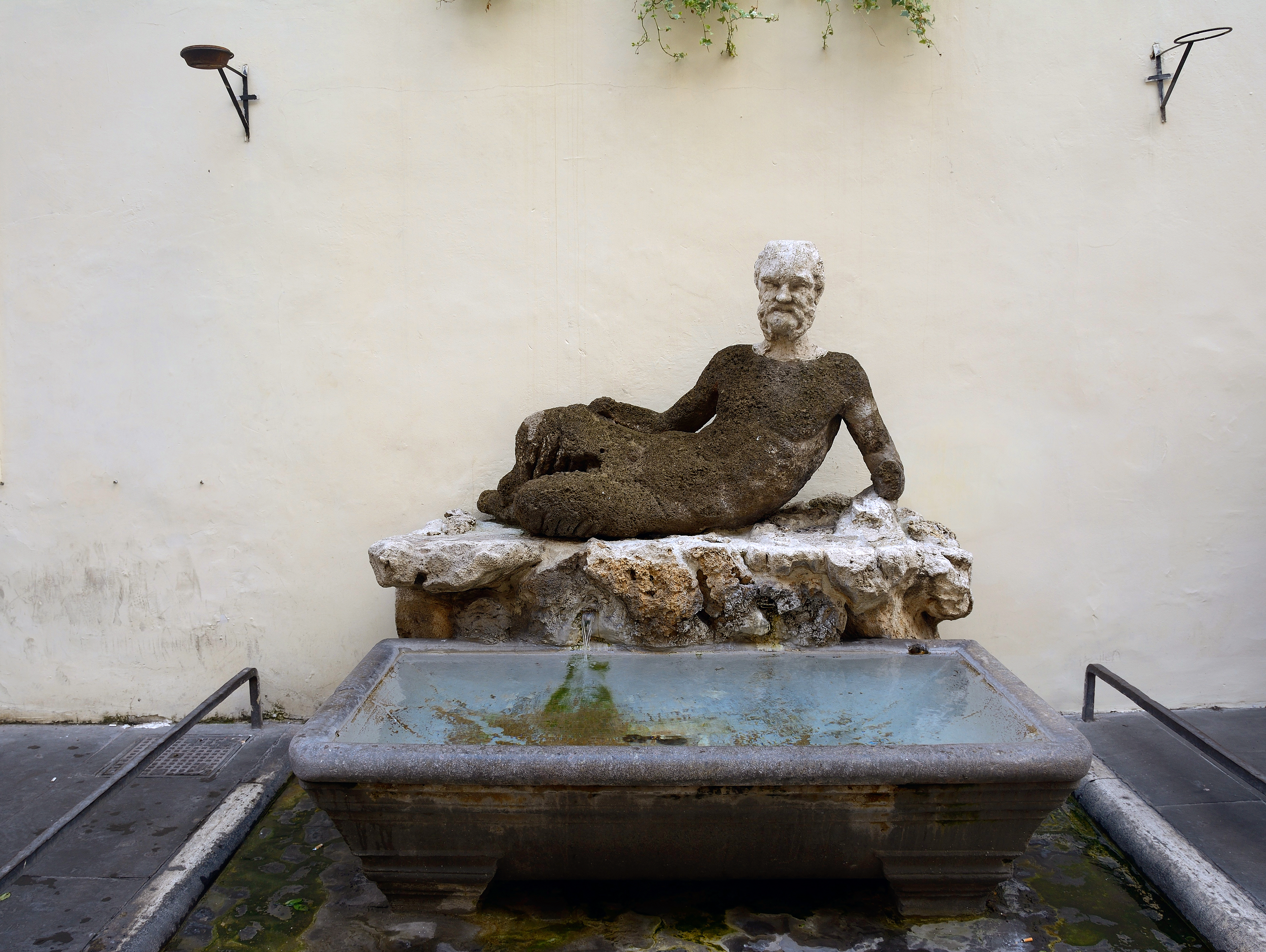
- Click on the map for a fullscreen view
- Year: 1581 (Patrizio Grandi)
- Type: Talking statues of Rome
- Subject: Silenus; Named for its grotesque appearance
- Location: Via del Babuino; 41°54′31″N 12°28′44″E

The Babuino (Romanesco: Il Babbuino; Italian: Il Babuino, The Baboon) is one of the talking statues of Rome, Italy. The fountain is situated in front of the Canova Tadolini Museum, in via del Babuino.

== History ==
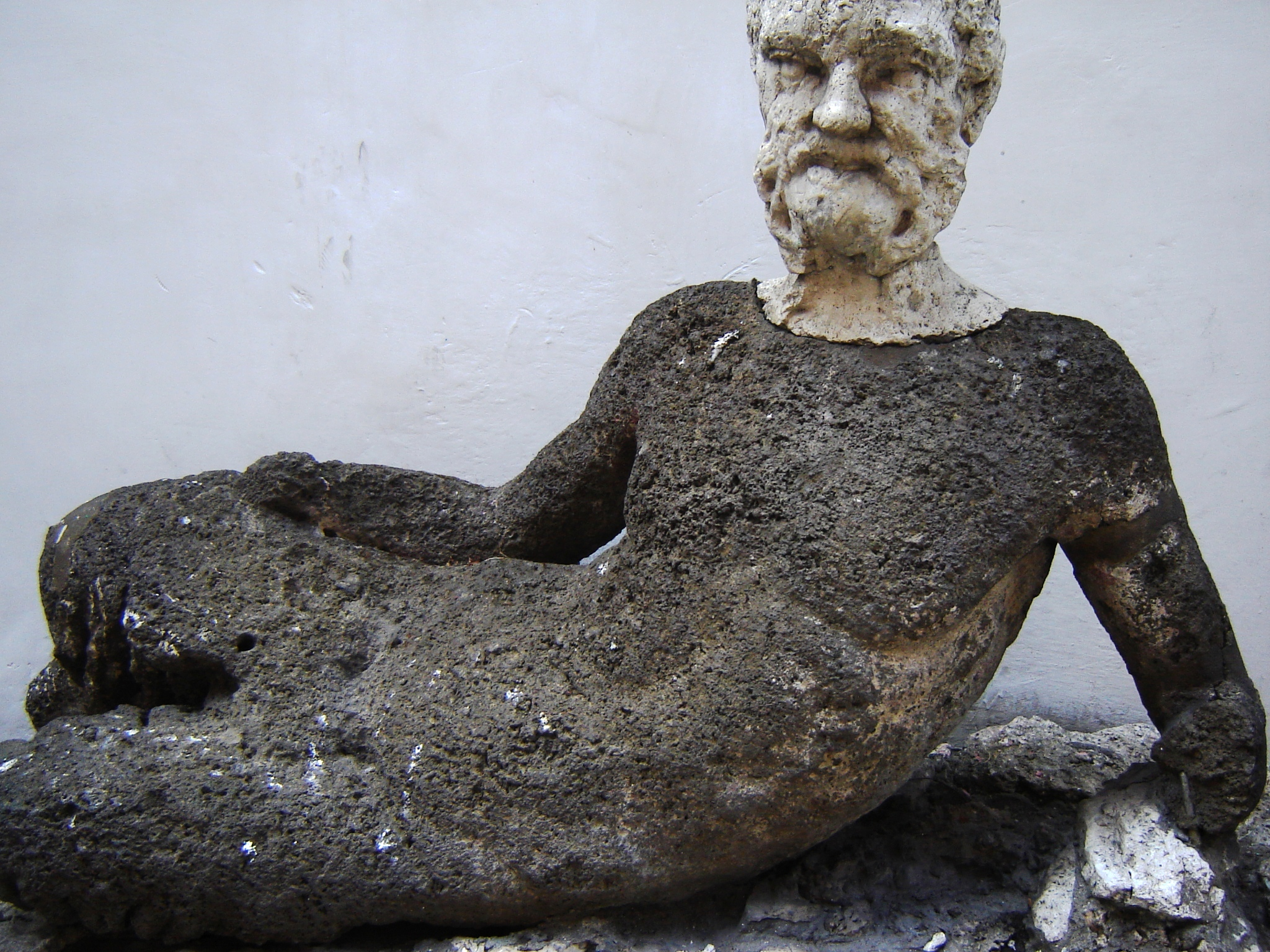
Details

The statue is an ancient depiction of a reclining Silenus: a character in Roman mythology, half man, half goat. In 1581, Patrizio Grandi, a rich merchant, built a public fountain in the former via Paolina, which he had decorated with this statue. According to the custom established by Pope Pius IV, he obtained free water for his house and fields in exchange for donating the fountain to the city. The people of Rome christened the figure "babuino" because they considered it ugly and deformed, like a baboon, and the street was nicknamed the "via del Babuino" as a result, the name eventually becoming the official one. After being moved to various other locations in Rome, the statue was returned to the street in 1957.

== Political comment and graffiti ==
Pasquinades – irreverent satirical inscriptions poking fun at public figures – were posted beside the "talking statues" of Rome in the 16th century. The pasquinades (or, in Italian, pasquinate) of Il Babuino are more properly called babuinate, but the principle of satirical criticism is the same.

The tradition of political comment continued as graffiti in modern times, to the extent that the fountain was considered an eyesore rather than an asset to this upmarket street. The wall behind the statue was covered in graffiti, although not on Babuino itself. Recently, the wall has been painted with an anti-vandal paint, to prevent the graffiti reappearing.

== See also ==
- Scior Carera in Milan.

== Sources ==
- Rendina, C., "Pasquino statua parlante", ROMA ieri, oggi, domani, n. 20, February 1990.

Preceded by Fontana dell'Acqua Paola	Landmarks of Rome; Babuino	Succeeded by Fontana della Barcaccia
