= Monument to Pietro Metastasio, Rome =

Monument of Roman poet and dramatist

Coordinates: 41.89786°N 12.46918°E

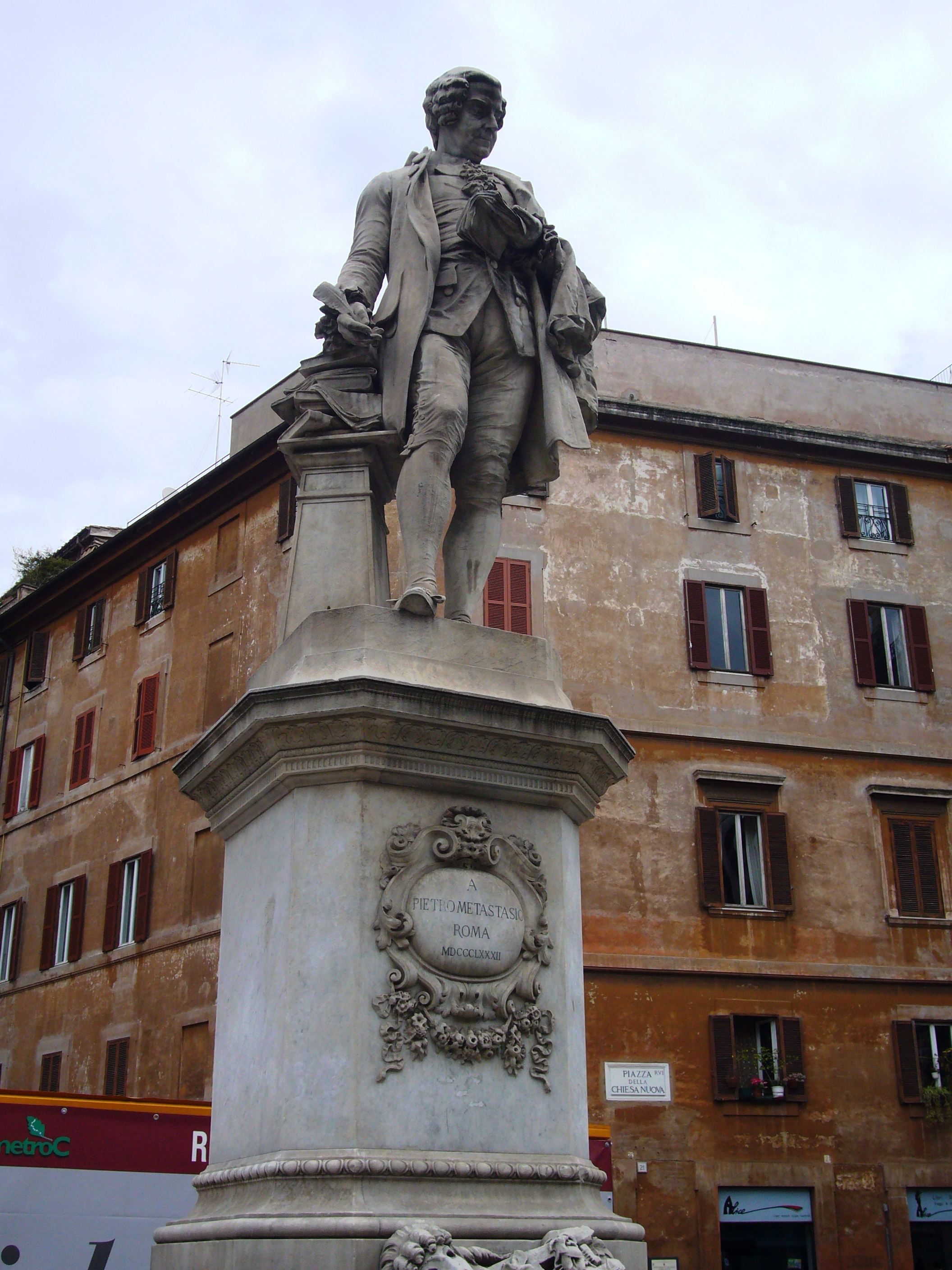
- Interactive map of Monument to Pietro Metastasio, Rome
- Location: Rome, Italy
- Designer: Emilio Gallori
- Type: Statue
- Material: Marble
- Opening date: 21 April 1886
- Dedicated to: Pietro Metastasio

The Monument to Pietro Metastasio is a memorial statue dedicated to the Roman poet and dramatist Pietro Metastasio (1698–1782); it is located along the Corso Vittorio Emanuele, at the piazza before the church of Santa Maria in Vallicella (Piazza di Chiesa Nuova), in central Rome, Italy.

In 1873, a committee of artists, led by Francesco Podesti, then director of the Academy of St Luke, decided to erect a statue to Metastasio, initially to be completed by the centenary of his death. A contest for a design was promulgated with an award of 25,000 Lira, paid in increments until completion. The contest was won in 1882 by the sculptor Emilio Gallori, but the monument was installed first in Piazza San Silvestro in Capite on 21 April 1886.

In the early 20th century, with the widening and embellishment of the Corso Vittorio Emanuele II, the statue was moved to its present location, which was close to the birth-house of Metastasio, located in via dei Cappellari #30. In addition, some of Metastasio's sacred works had been first presented at the adjacent Oratory of Filippo Neri. Metastasio himself was buried in Vienna, where he lived the last four decades of his life.

The marble statue rises on a high pedestal. Metastasio stands beside a short column stacked with books. In his right hand he holds a writing quill, and on his right a pamphlet. He looks down towards the piazza. The base is ornamented with the symbols of the melodramatic arts: a mask and a lyre. The rear has a shield with the lupa, symbol of Rome.
