= Talking statues of Rome =

Method of anonymous political expression in Rome

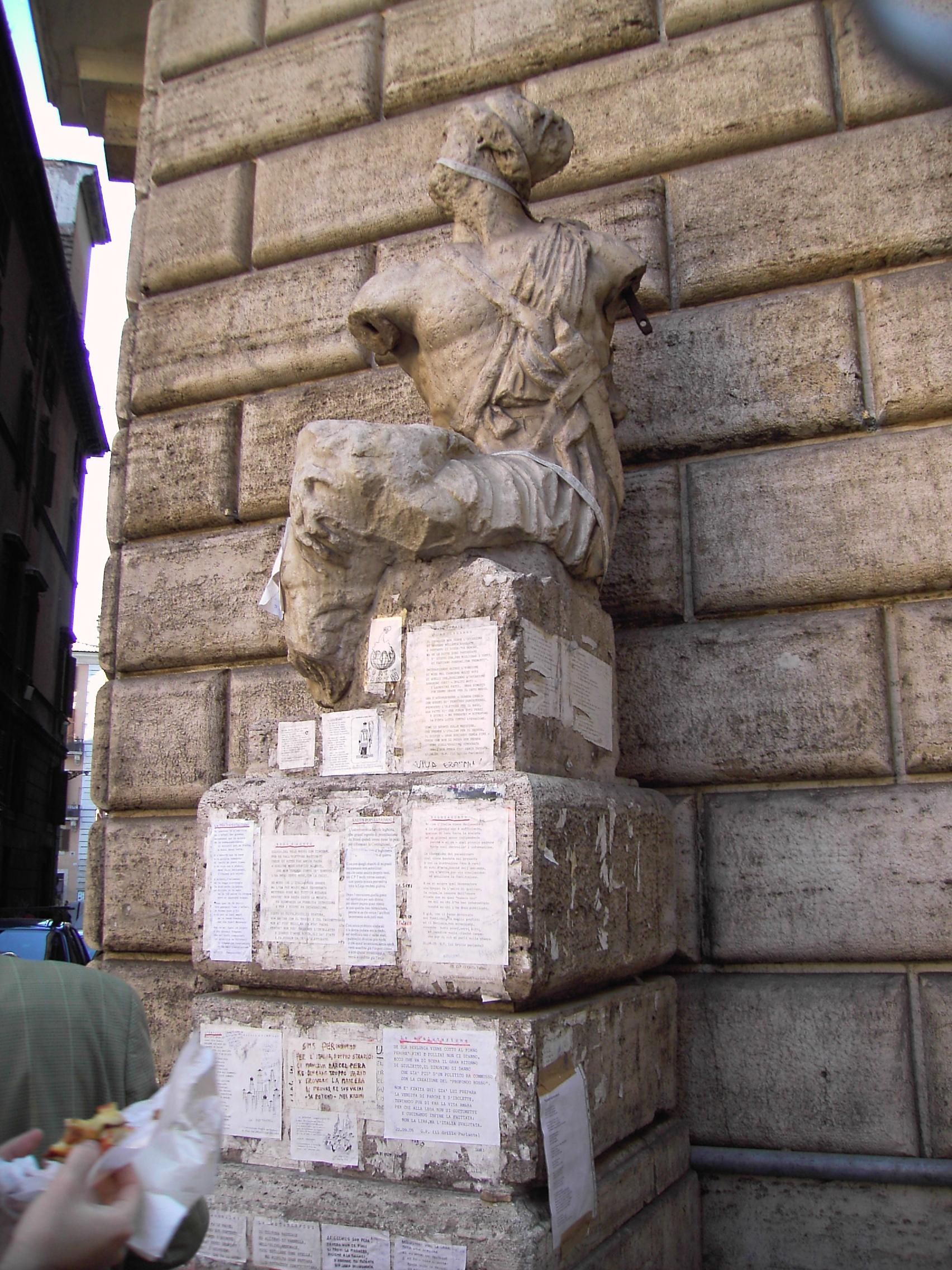
The statue Pasquino, the first talking statue of Rome

The talking statues of Rome (Italian: statue parlanti di Roma) or the Congregation of Wits (Congrega degli arguti) provided an outlet for a form of anonymous political expression in Rome. Criticisms in the form of poems or witticisms were posted on well-known statues in Rome, as an early instance of bulletin board. It began in the 16th century and continues to the present day.

In addition to Pasquino and Marforio, the talking statues include: Madama Lucrezia, Abbot Luigi, Il Babuino, and Il Facchino.

== History ==
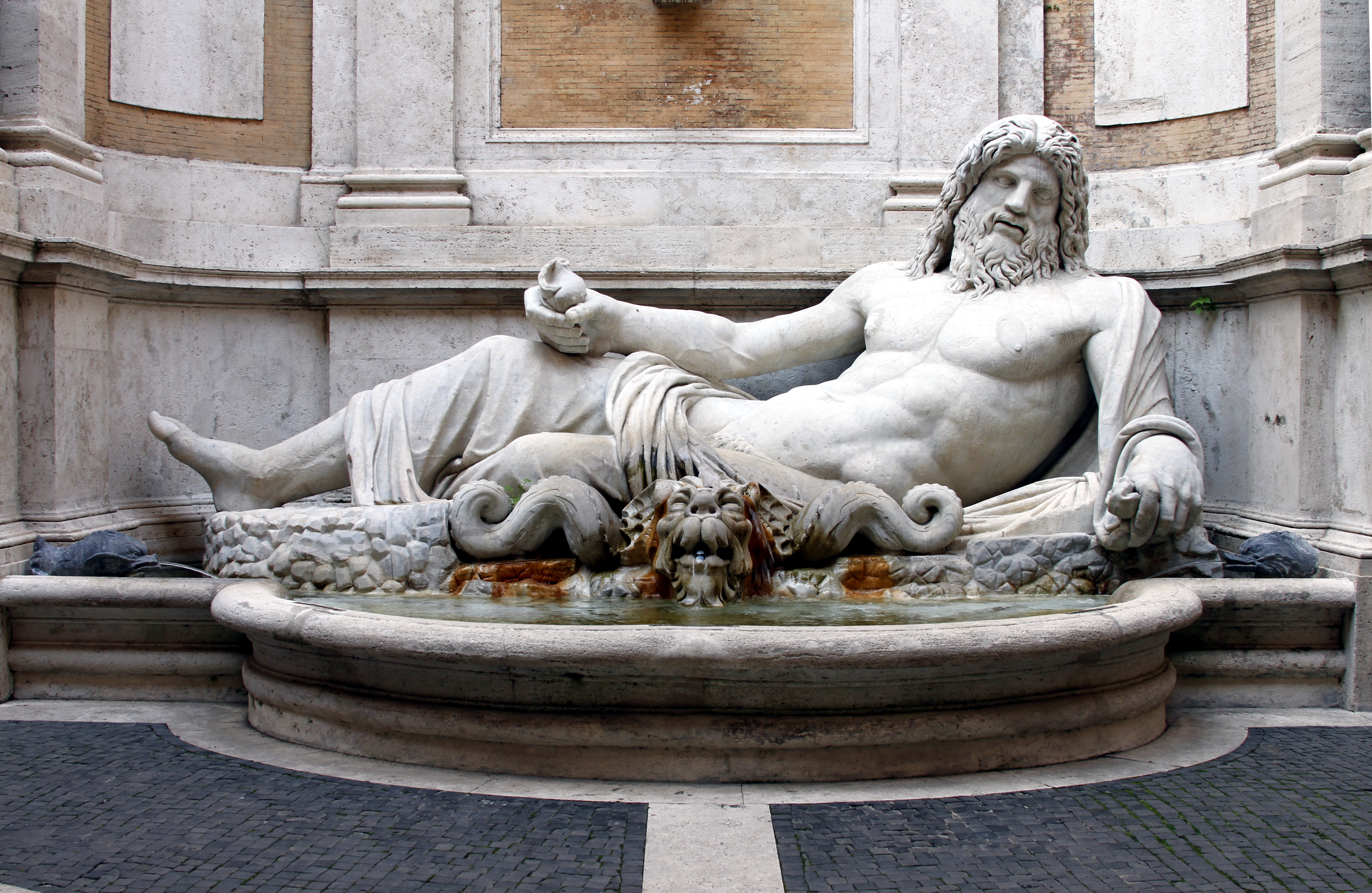
Marforio at the Musei Capitolini

The first talking statue was that of Pasquino, a damaged piece of sculpture on a small piazza. In modern times the weathered fragment has been identified as representing the mythical king of Sparta, Menelaus, husband of Helen of Troy, and a major character in the Iliad, holding the body of Patroclus. In 1501, the statue was found during road construction and set up in the piazza; soon after small poems or epigrams critical of religious and civil authorities began to be posted on it. One story of the origin of the statue's name, and of its witticisms, is that it was named to honor a local resident named Pasquino. A tailor by trade (in some versions of the story he is a barber or schoolmaster), this man's career took him into the Vatican, where he would learn behind-the-scenes gossip. He would then spread this gossip, with acerbic commentary, for the entertainment of friends and neighbors. Upon his death, the statue was named in his honor, and people began posting commentary similar to Pasquino's on the statue. The statue seems to have been a local institution; it was also dressed up as a pagan god on the feast day of Saint Mark.

Some sources suggest that the first postings were little more than schoolboys taunting their teachers, but the statues quickly became a major outlet for critiquing government and religious leaders. Pasquino became so famous that his name was turned into an English word, pasquinade, which means a satirical protest in poetry.

A number of popes, who were often the butt of criticism from the statues, sought to limit the posting of commentary on Pasquino. Adrian VI planned to have it thrown into the Tiber River, and was only dissuaded when told that, like a frog, the statue would only croak louder in water. Another potentially apocryphal story has a reward being offered to the anonymous writers if they came forward. According to the tale, one man responded, and his hands were cut off. Eventually, the authorities settled for posting guards by the statue to prevent the posting of more commentary. As a result, the public turned to other statues, who joined Pasquino as talking statues.

These other statues included Marforio, which was sometimes used to post responses to writings posted on Pasquino, creating a repartee between the two statues.

== Gallery ==
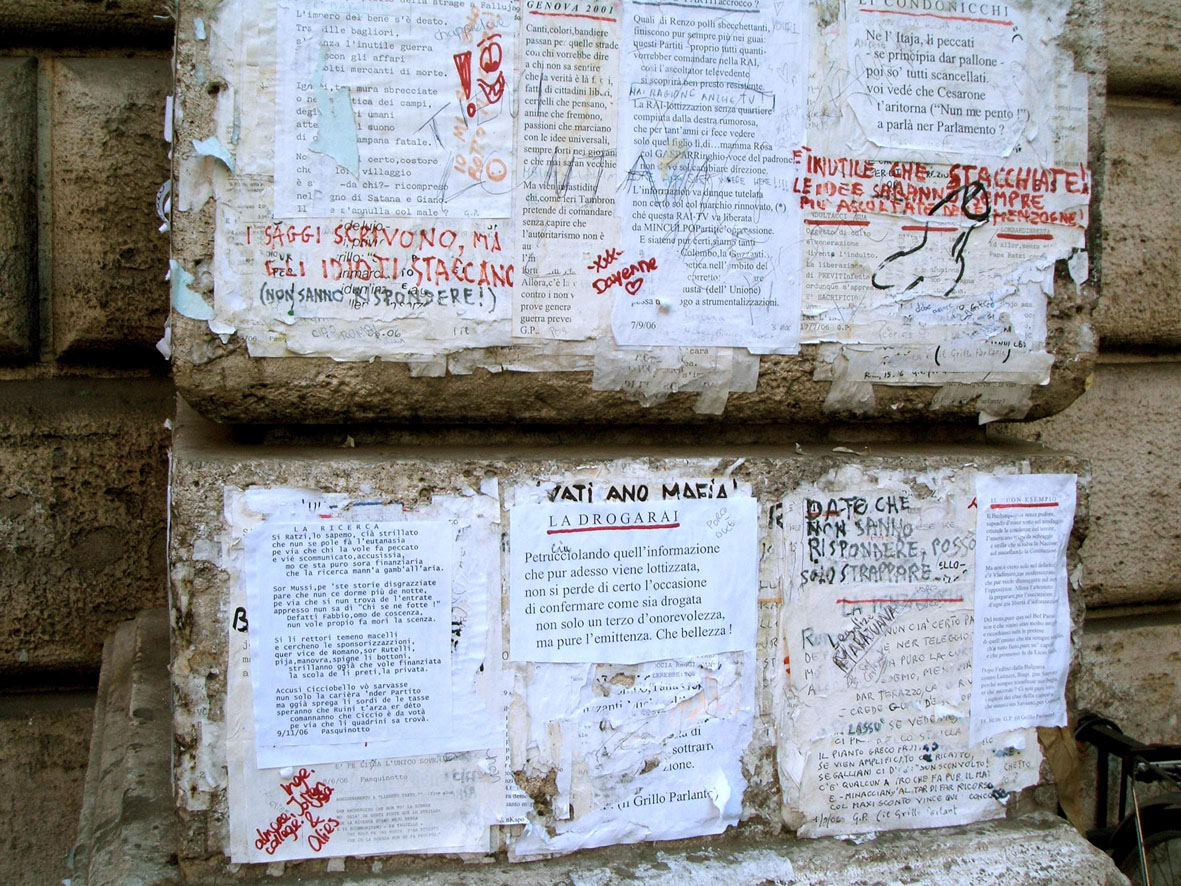
Detail of modern pasquinades glued to the base of Pasquino

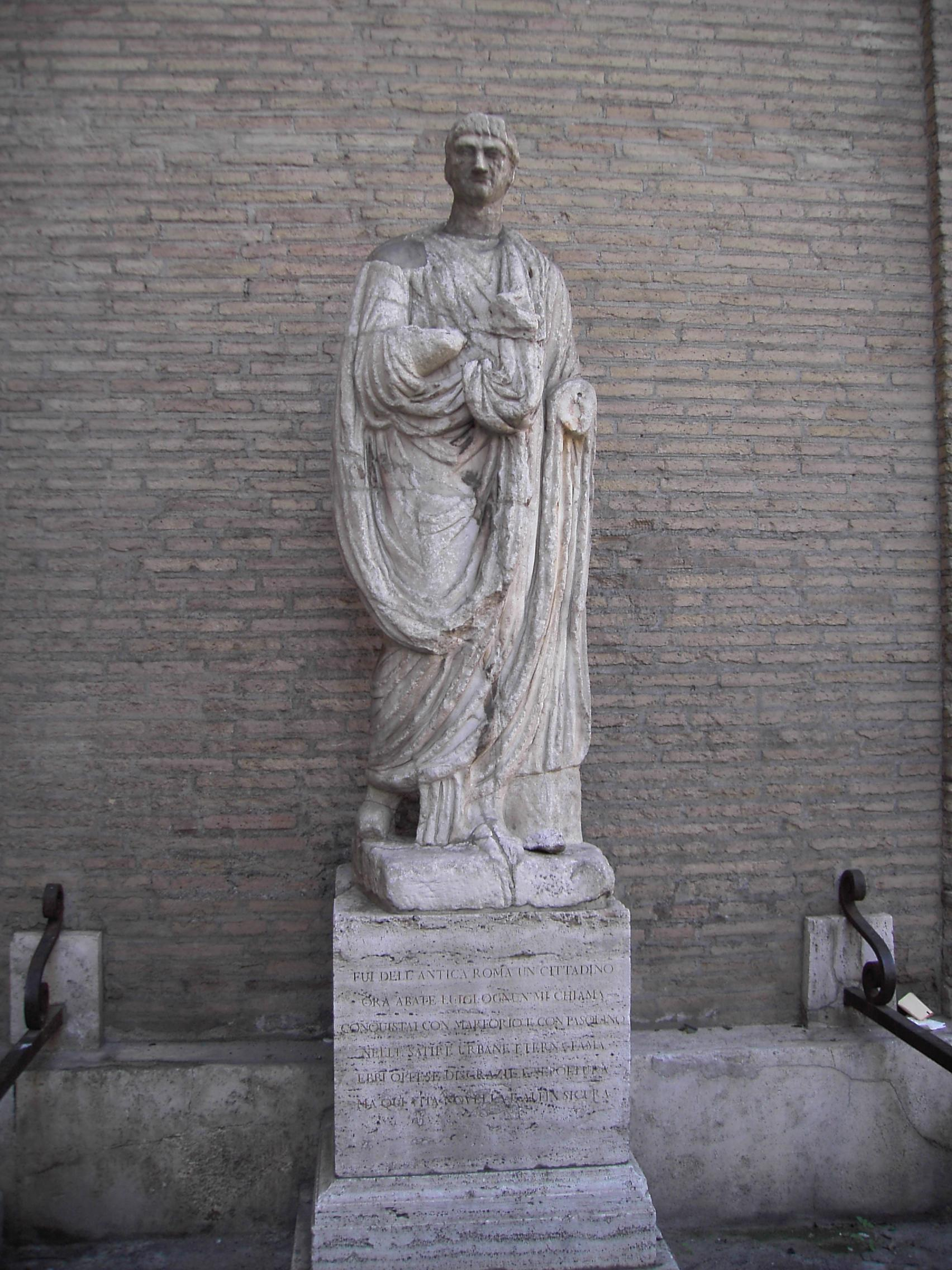
Abate Luigi, Piazza Vidoni

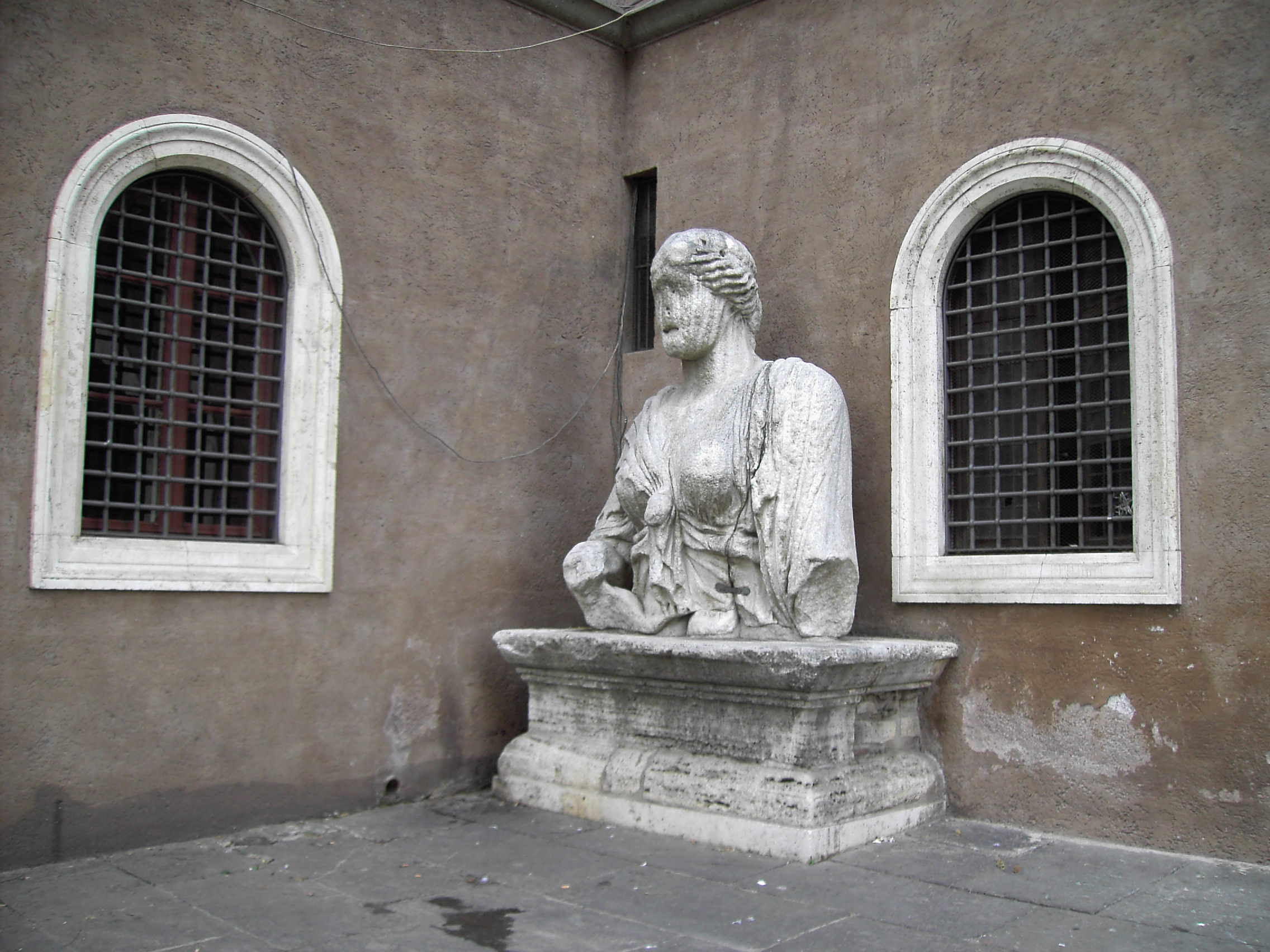
Madama Lucrezia, Piazza San Marco

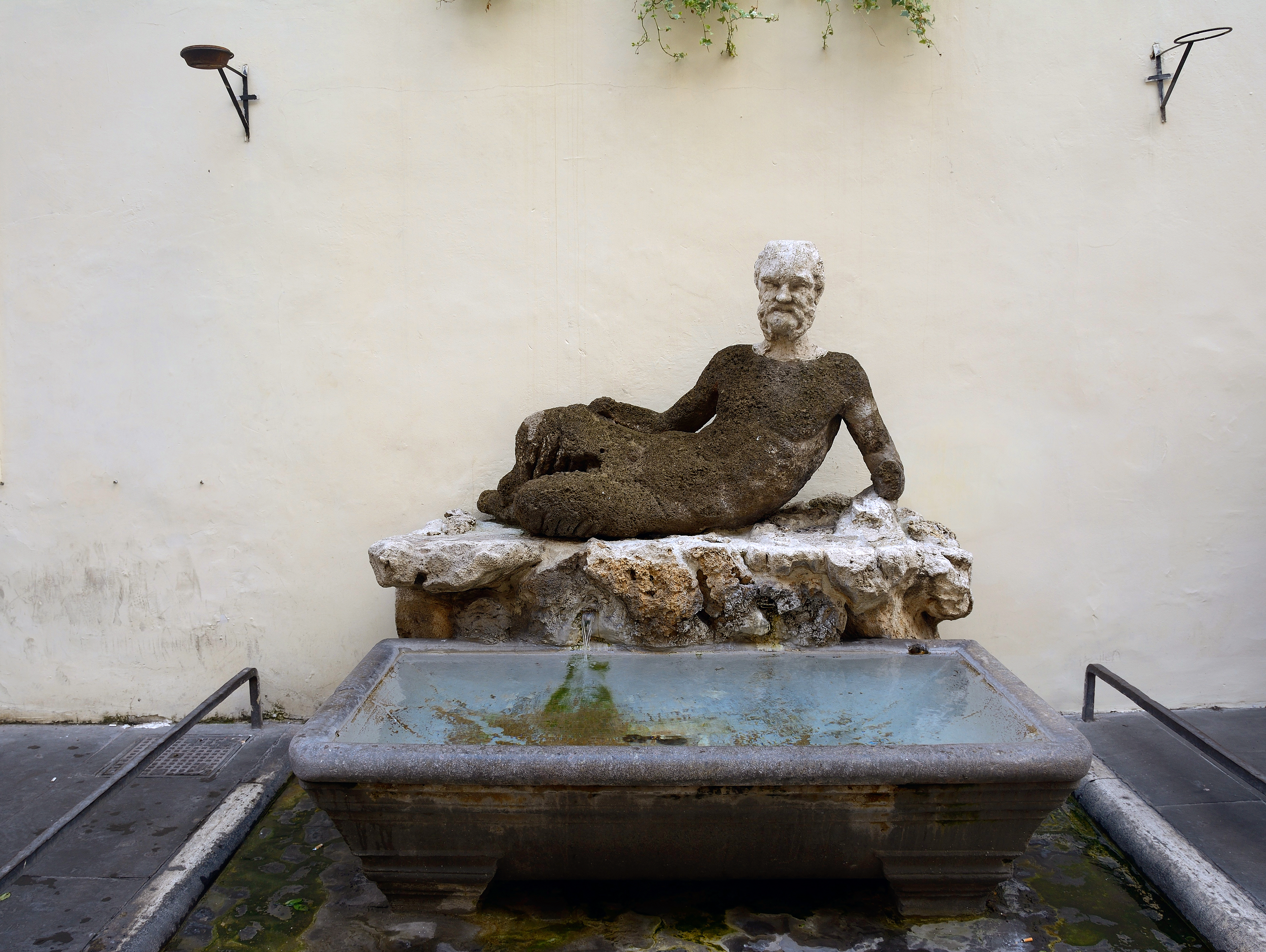
Il Babuino, Fontana del Babuino, Sant'Atanasio dei Greci

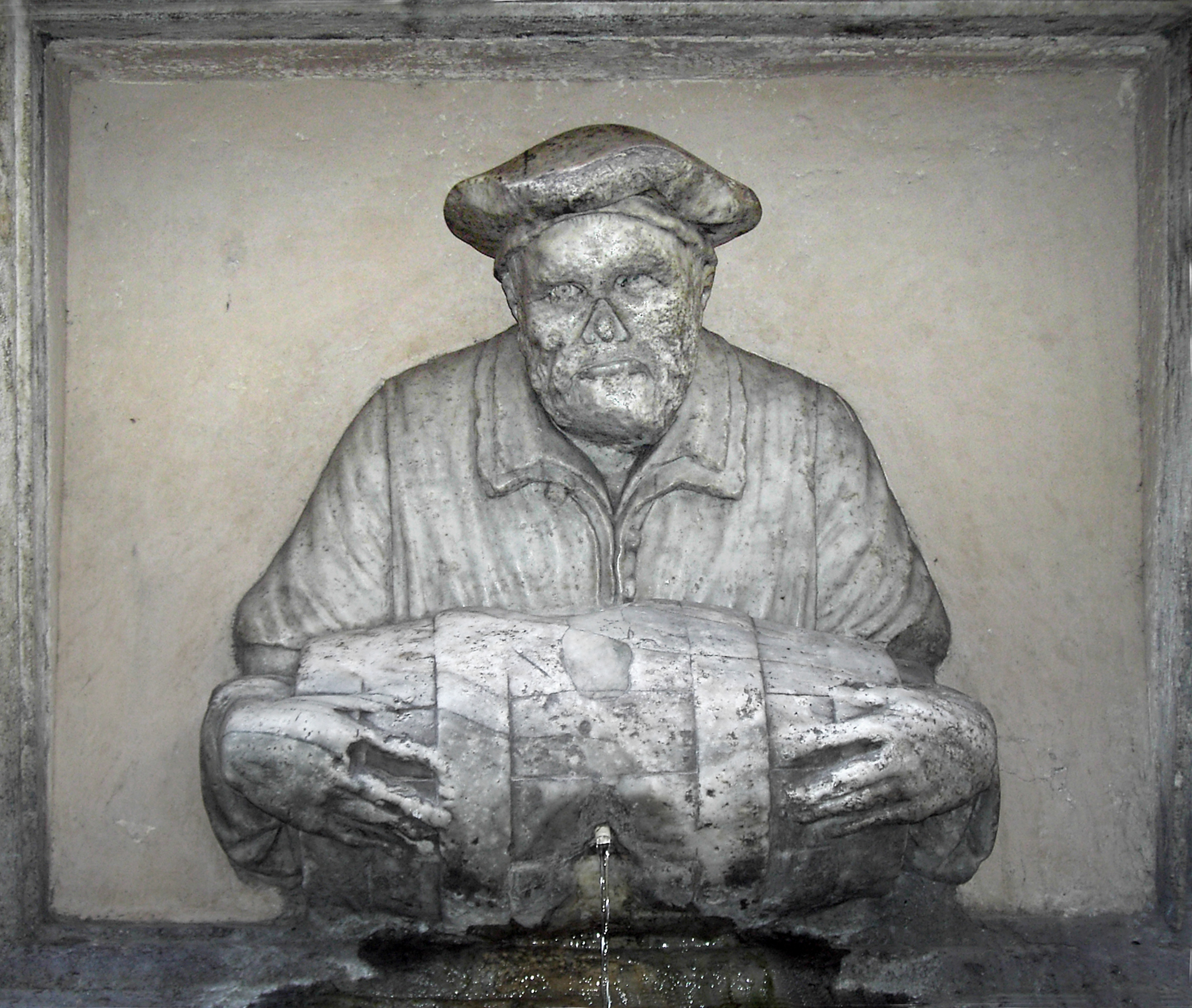
Fontana del Facchino, Via Lata

== See also ==
- Scior Carera, a talking statue in Milan
