= Statue of Francis of Assisi, Rome =

Monument in Italy

Statue of Francis of Assisi
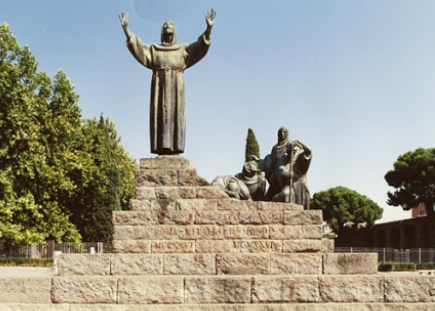
- The monument in 2020
- Subject: Francis of Assisi
- Location: Rome, Italy

A statue of Francis of Assisi is installed in Rome, Italy.
