= Scior Carera =

Ancient Roman sculpture in Milan, Italy

Coordinates: 45°27′56.0″N 9°11′44.4″E

- Omm de preja
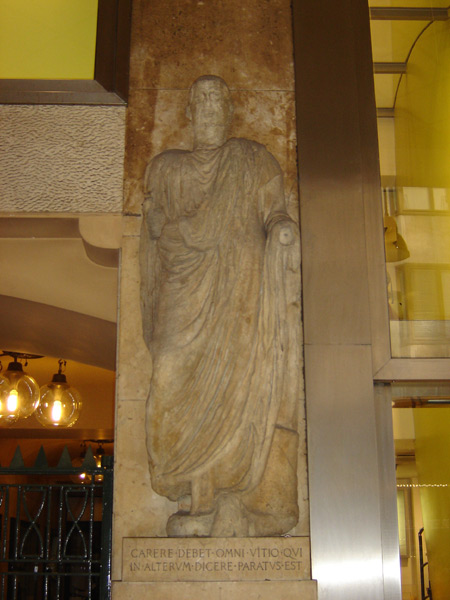
- Scior Carera
- Year: Ancient Roman
- Medium: Marble
- Subject: Man wearing a toga
- Location: Milan

Scior Carera (Milanese for 'Mister Carera'; IPA: [ˈʃuːr kaˈreːra]) and Omm de preja ('stone man'; IPA: [ˈɔm de ˈprɛja]) are traditional, popular names used to refer to an ancient Roman sculpture located in Milan, Italy, at No. 13 of Corso Vittorio Emanuele (next to the Duomo). Before being located where it is now (on the facade of a modern building) in the mid 20th century, the sculpture has been in different places around the city, most notably in Via San Pietro dall'Orto.

It is a marble bas-relief dating back to the 3rd century, depicting a man wearing a toga, with the right leg slightly put forward; it has lost its arms as well as its head. The latter was replaced in the Middle Ages, supposedly to represent archbishop Adelmanno Menclozzi.

The name Carera is a corruption of the first word carere (Latin for 'to lack') of the epigraph found below the statue, a sentence credited to Cicero: Carere debet omni vitio qui in alterum dicere paratus est ('Anybody who wants to criticise someone should be free from all faults').

Another inscription below this one recalls the former collocation of the statue in Via San Pietro all'Orto as well as the role this statue has played in the 19th century during the Austrian rule of Milan; at the time, in fact, there was the common habit of attaching satirical political messages to the statue, much like what happened in Rome with Pasquino and other "talking statues". In particular, the so-called tobacco riots that started the Five Days of Milan (whereby the Milanese quit smoking to cause economical damage to the Austrians) was possibly initiated on 31 December 1848 by a message attached to Scior Carera.

Because of the role of the statue in the fight for independence of Milan, its name was used for a satirical journal (L'uomo di pietra, Italian equivalent of Omm de preja) that was published between 1856 and 1864 and again after 1878.
