= Fontane di Piazza Farnese =

Pair of fountains in Rome

Fontane della Piazza Farnese
- Fountain
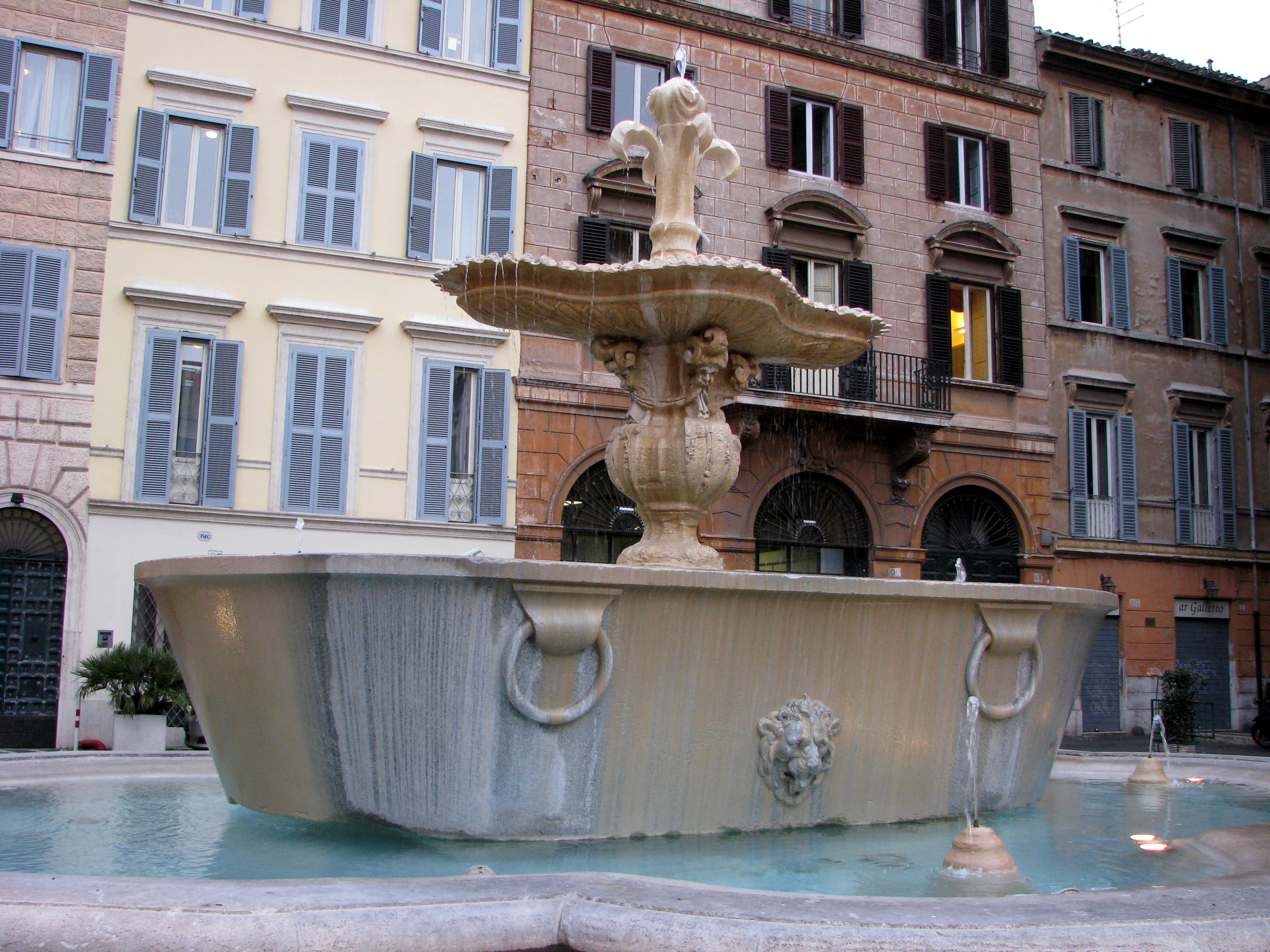
- One of the two fountains in Piazza Farnese
- Location: Rome
- Interactive map of Fontane della Piazza Farnese
- Coordinates: 41°53′41″N 12°28′15″E

The Fontane della Piazza Farnese are two identical decorative fountains located in the Piazza Farnese, in front of the Palazzo Farnese in Rome, Italy. They were placed in the Piazza in the 16th century.

== History ==
The granite stone basins of the fountains are believed to come from the ancient Roman Baths of Caracalla. The emblems on the upper part of the fountain are those of the Farnese family, and the builder of the Palazzo, Cardinal Alessandro Farnese, later Pope Paul III.

A second basin—virtually identical to the previous one and likely of the same origin—was also located in Piazza San Marco, likewise from 1466 onwards. Some forty years after installing the first one, Cardinal Alessandro Farnese managed to acquire the second in exchange for a smaller one and moved it to the square in front of his palace, placing both in the positions currently occupied by the fountains. Since the great "Acqua Vergine" aqueduct was under construction at the time, it is likely that the cardinal already intended to create a pair of fountains and wanted to have the basins ready in anticipation of the conduits eventually bringing water to the square.

However, it never reached these areas in sufficient quantities. In fact, until the beginning of the 17th century, the areas on the right bank of the Tiber, as well as some on the left bank—including the rioni of Regola and Ponte—were still inadequately supplied with water, and providing Trastevere, the Vatican, and Borgo with an adequate water supply was one of the first problems addressed by Pope Paul V upon his election. In reality, as had been the case with some of his recent predecessors, the pontiff’s ultimate aim was to secure a substantial reserve of running water for the gardens of his Vatican residence. However, the Municipality of Rome agreed to contribute to the cost of restoring the ancient Trajan Aqueduct, which, drawing water from Lake Bracciano, would have provided the areas on the right bank of the river with an independent water supply. Construction began in 1608, and the main project was completed in 1610. Several secondary conduits were then added, allowing the water to reach, among other places, the Vatican and the rione of Borgo, as well as supplying a number of fountains designed or renovated for the occasion. A second branch, carried across Ponte Sisto, was extended to the left bank of the Tiber and thence northward, running parallel to the river, in order to meet the needs of the rioni of Regola and Ponte, which were not adequately served by the other aqueducts.

Taking advantage of this branch and of the water supply granted to the Farnese family, the architect Girolamo Rainaldi was finally able, in 1626, to transform the two basins in Piazza Farnese into fountains. Drawing inspiration from designs by Della Porta, he placed each of them inside a much larger travertine basin, likewise oblong in shape, with markedly convex sides, resting on a stepped base. At the center of each basin he placed an ornate amphora-shaped baluster, supporting a further basin similar in shape to the outer one but much smaller—approximately one-quarter of its length—and surmounted by the heraldic lily of the Farnese family. Water emerged from seven points: a central jet from the lily at the top, two from the ends of the Roman basin, and another four from the larger basin, corresponding to its curved sections.

The two fountains differ in only a few details: the northern one is slightly smaller and better preserved than the other, with signs of restoration visible particularly on the lion heads; the other, by contrast, does not appear to have undergone later alterations and is therefore closer to its original form. However, it required restoration in 1938–39, while a further intervention involving both fountains was carried out in 1992–93. The last intervention, on the southern fountain alone, took place in 2007.

== gallery ==
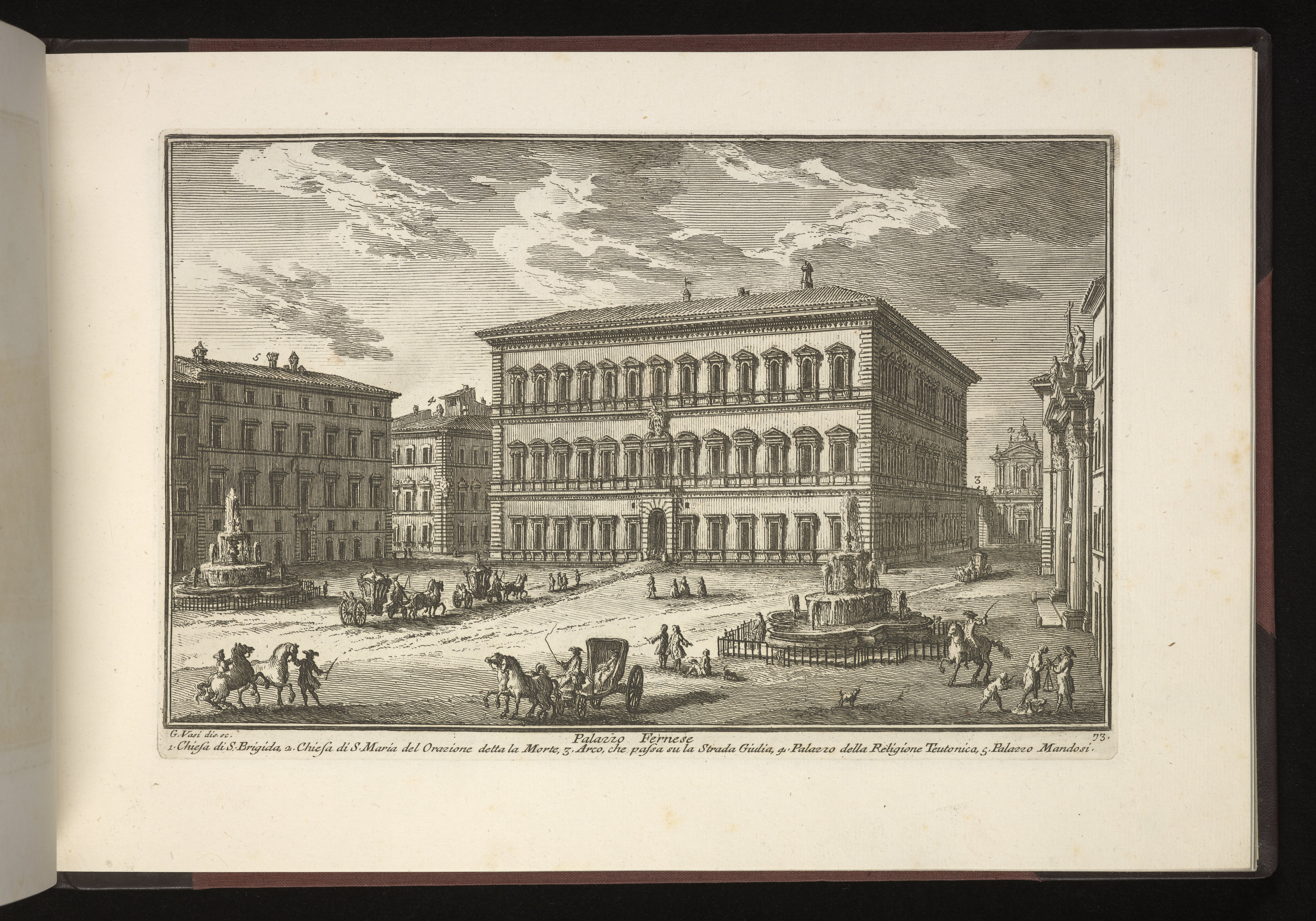

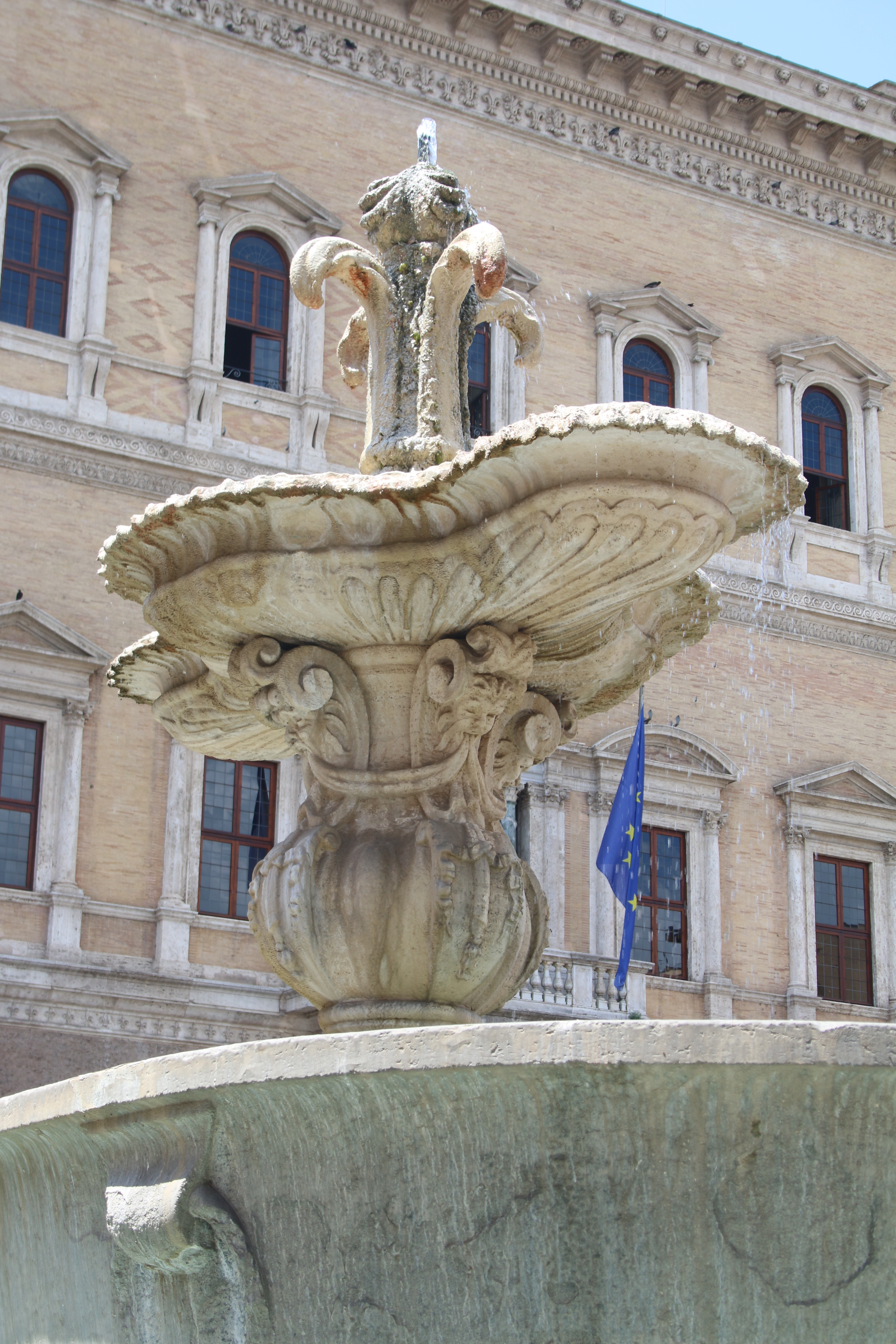

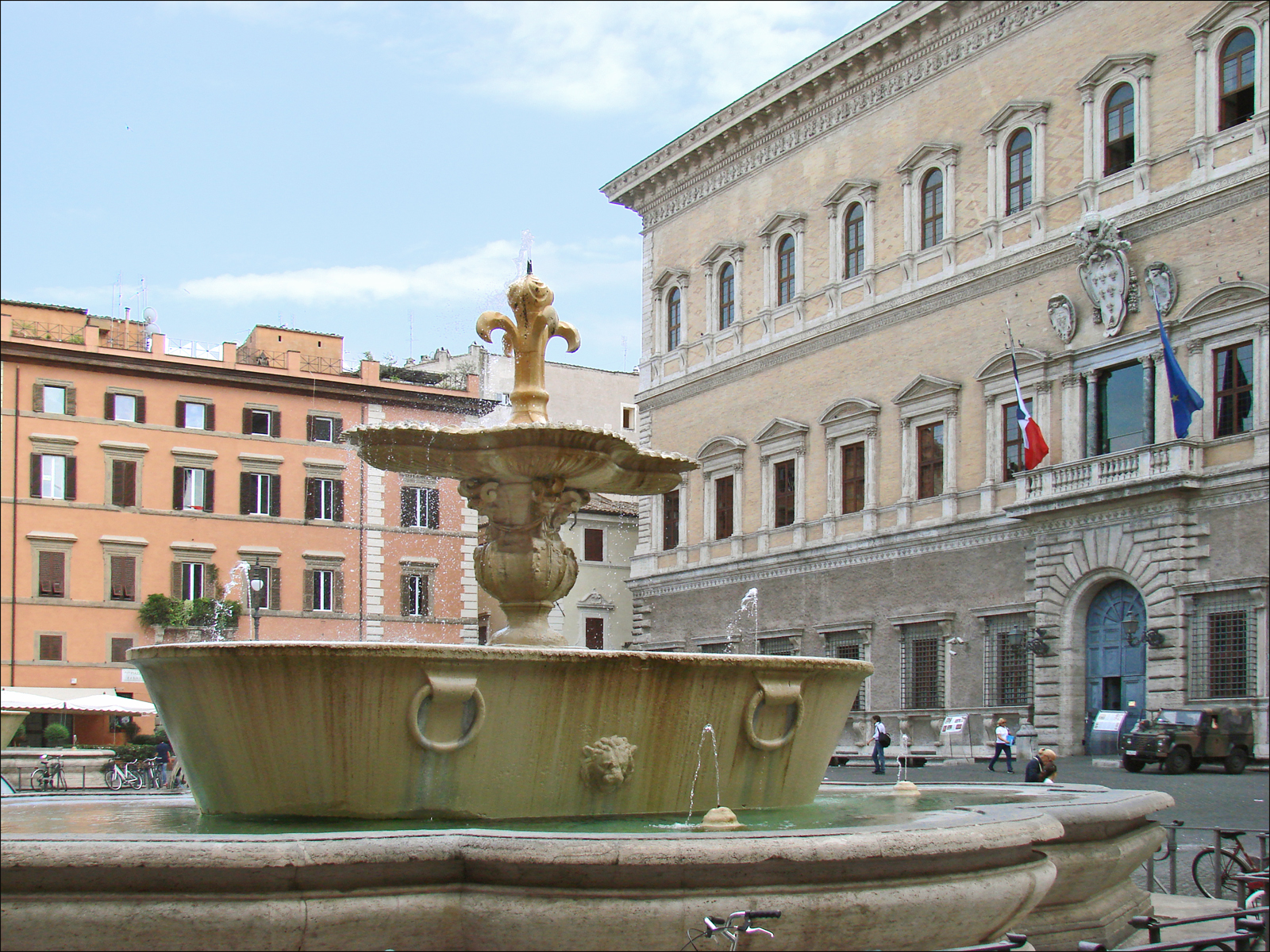

== See also ==
- List of fountains in Rome.

Preceded by Fontana di Piazza Colonna	Landmarks of Rome; Fontane di Piazza Farnese	Succeeded by Fontana della Piazza dei Quiriti
