= Piazza Farnese =

Square in Rome

- City square
- {{{other_names}}}
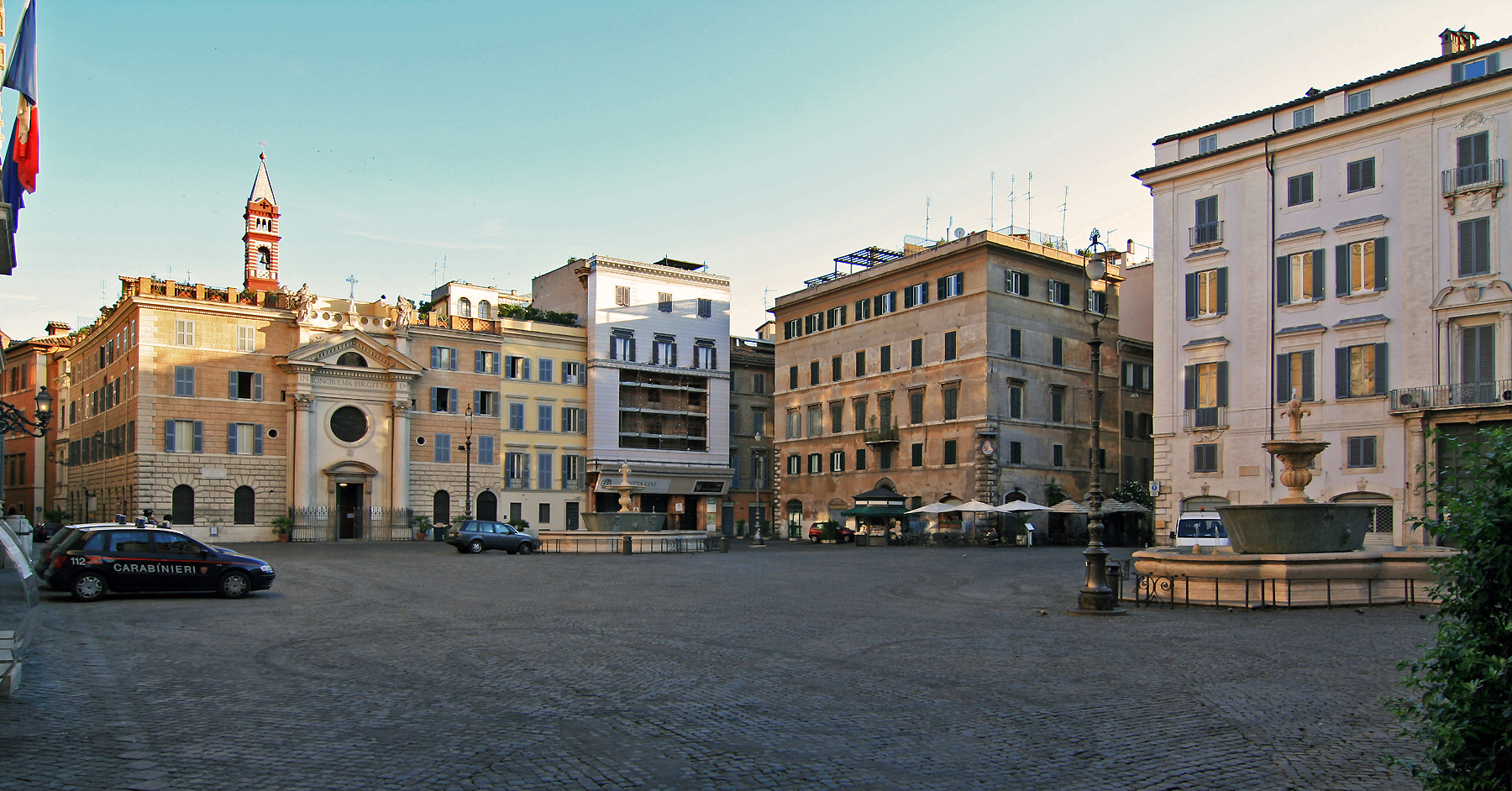
- Piazza Farnese. On the right, the Gallo Palace.
- Location: Rome, Italy
- Interactive map of Piazza Farnese
- Coordinates: 41°53′42″N 12°28′16″E

Piazza Farnese is the main square of the Regola district of Rome, Italy.

== History ==
The history and breadth of the square began in 16th century, when Cardinal Alessandro Farnese, future Paul III, bought several houses on the square to demolish them and create an appropriate space palazzo which he had designed by Antonio da Sangallo the Younger. The works began in 1514, were interrupted by the sack of Rome of 1527, and resumed after the election of the cardinal to the papal throne with the name of Paul III and, from 1546, under the direction of Michelangelo.

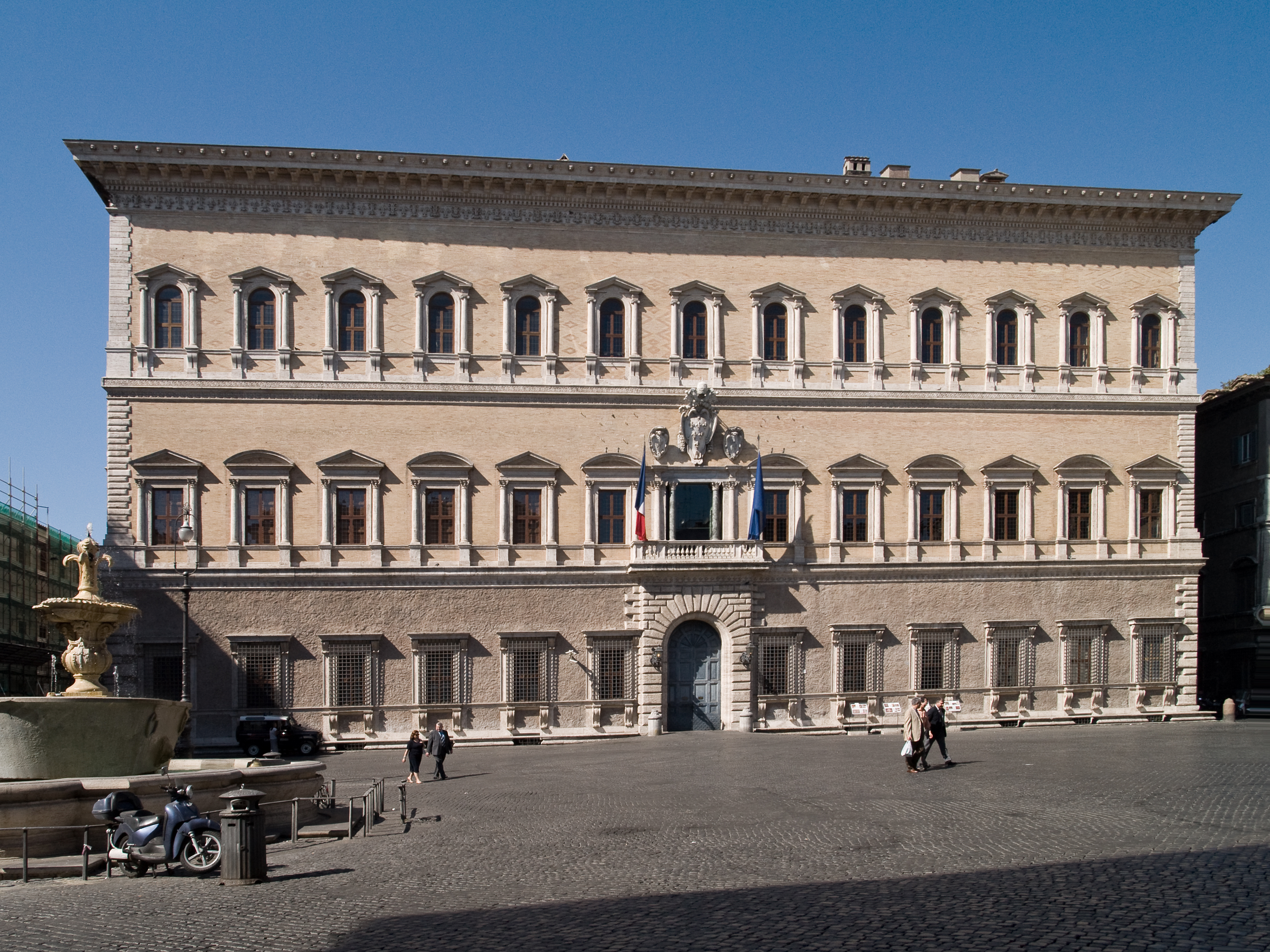
Palazzo Farnese, facade on the square

The square was paved in 1545, with a brick as a sort of pertinence of the building, and there was placed for ornamental purposes, in axis with the entrance on the facade, one of the two Egyptian granite tanks present today. According to Moroni (and the news was in Flaminio Vacca, Memories of various antiquities found in different places in the City of Rome, written by Flaminio Vacca in 1594, No 23) the tanks came from the Baths of Caracalla. The first was found during the pontificate of Pope Paul II, and from these it was brought to Piazza San Marco, to adorn its Palazzo di Venezia. The second was found under Paul III and made by them here, adorning his palace. On the origin of the two granite tanks, however, the debate is long and unfinished After Pope Paul V had led the Aqueducts in Rome to Trastevere and also, bypassing the Tiber, to the Rule, and Gregory XV had granted 40 ounces to the Farnese for the feeding of the fountains, the family acquired the fountain of Piazza San Marco and commissioned Girolamo Rainaldi, around 1626, to draw the two fountains in which the two pools were located. The fountains were purely ornamental and surrounded by a gate. For the benefit of the people (and also of the animals), the fountain of the Mascherone was erected at the beginning of via Giulia.

== Buildings on the square ==
Off the square, there are eight streets and alleys, of which the most important is via di Monserrato. The most important buildings that overlook, beyond Palazzo Farnese, are the church and the convent of Santa Brigida, the palace of the Rooster of Roccagiovane, in front of Palazzo Farnese between Baullari and via della Corda, and Palazzo Mandosi Mignanelli on the right, in the corner with Vicolo dei Venti. (The latter name is not derived from "winds" in the meteorological sense, but from a family that had houses there). Other buildings are 19th-century reconstructions of older buildings.

== See also ==
- Fontane di Piazza Farnese

Preceded by Piazza della Repubblica, Rome	Landmarks of Rome; Piazza Farnese	Succeeded by Piazza Navona
