= Fontana della Piazza dei Quiriti =

Fountain in Rome, Italy

- Fountain
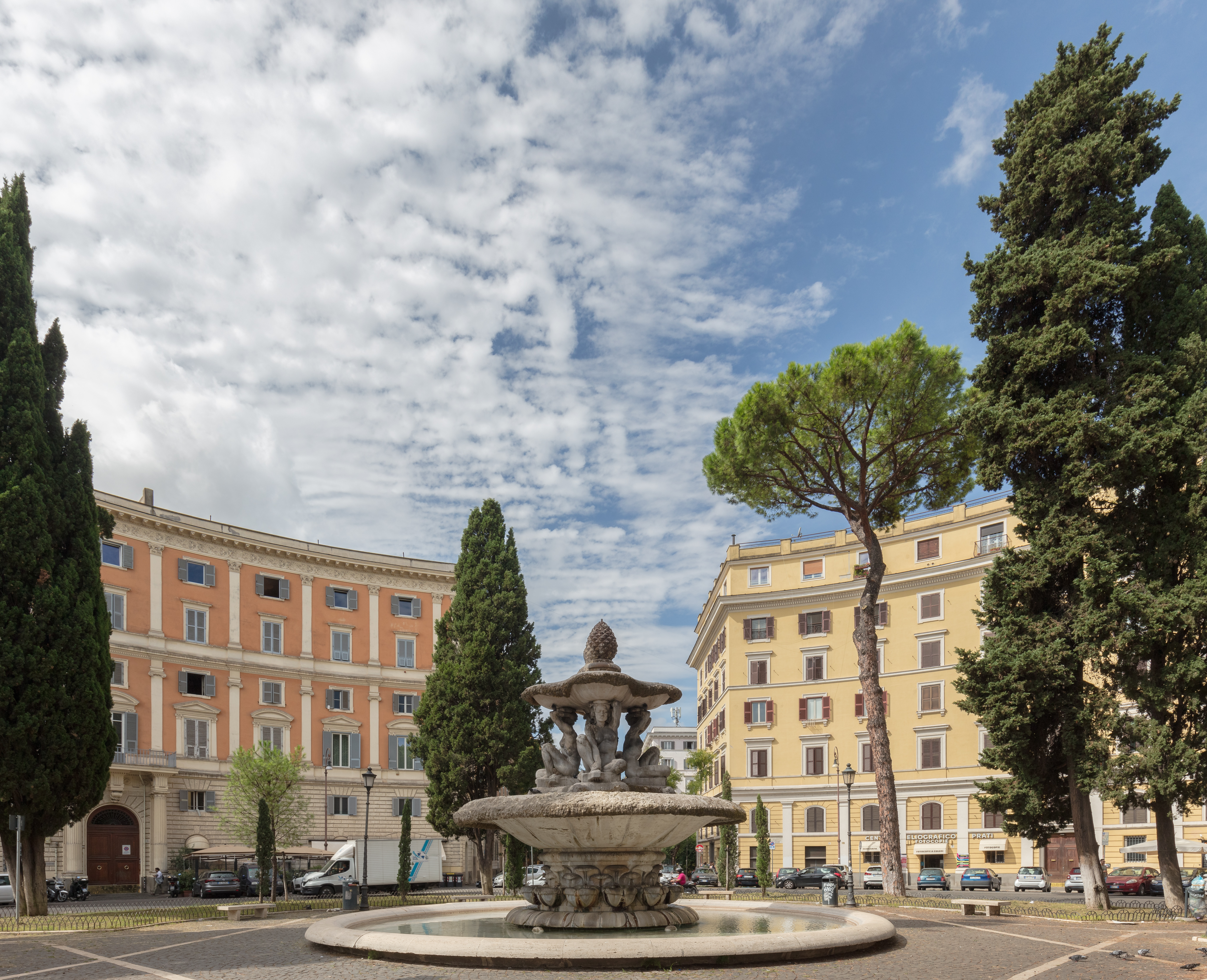
- Fontana delle Cariatidi
- Location: Prati, Rome
- Interactive map of Fontana della Piazza dei Quiriti
- Coordinates: 41°54′33.25″N 12°27′52.2″E

The Fontana della Piazza dei Quiriti is a fountain in the Piazza dei Quiriti in Rome, in the middle of the Prati rione. The plaza is named after the inhabitants of the city of Cures, the Curites or later Quirites, namely the Sabines, who became inhabitants and co-founders of Rome. Another theory derives the name from the god Quirinus, a Roman deity.

The fountain was constructed in 1928 by sculptor Attilio Selva, and includes female caryatid sculptures.

== Design ==
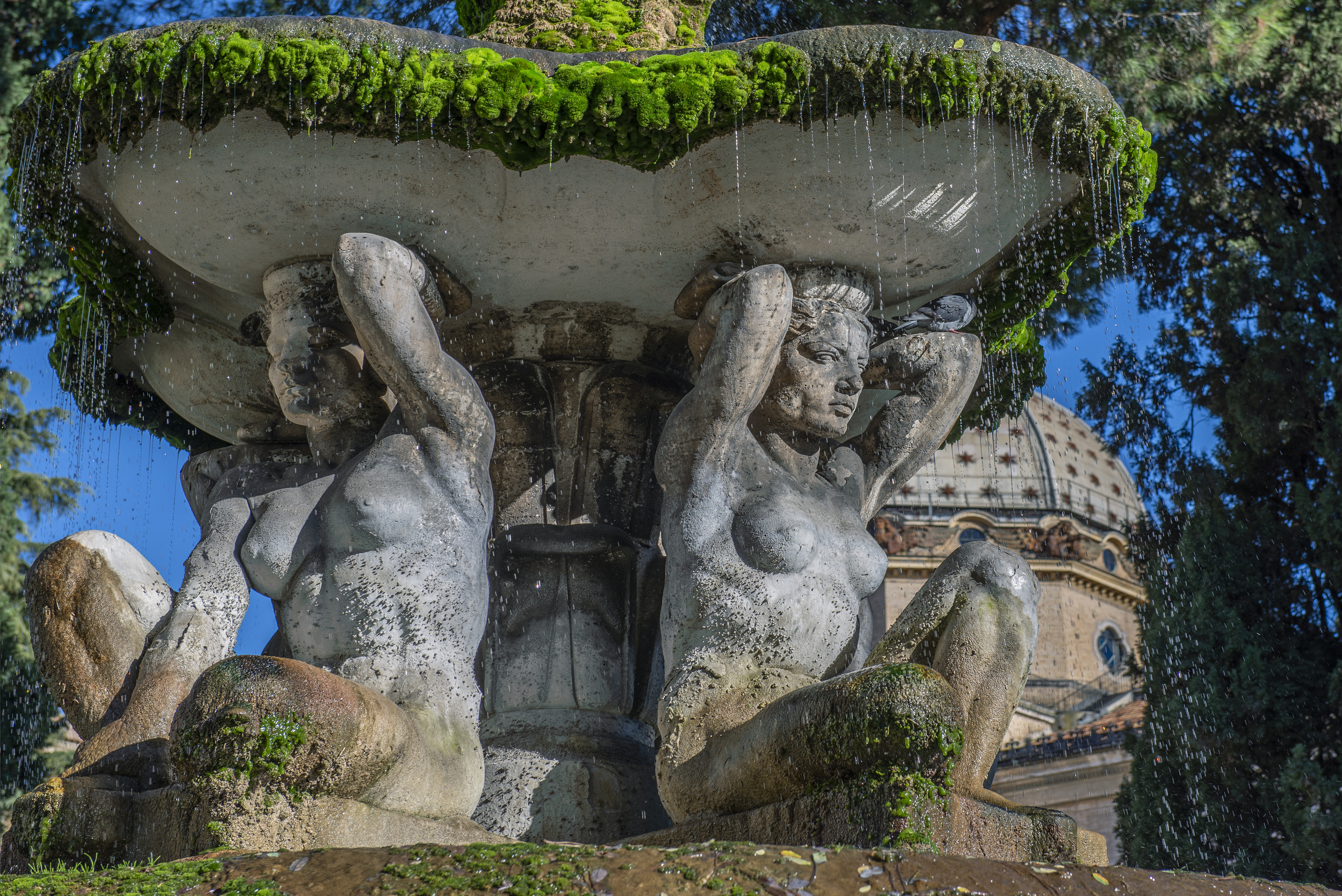
Caryatid detail

The Fountain of the Caryatids is in the center of the plaza, and was built in 1928 by sculptor Attilio Selva (Trieste 1888–1970). It was commissioned by the governor of Rome, Ludovico Spada Veralli Potenziani, who had been directed by Mussolini to manage the Capital. The realization of Fontana was considered scandalous for the presence of the four statues of naked women. The design is thought to be one of the causes that brought Mussolini to dismiss the governor in 1928.

== Description ==
The work consists of a circular pool slightly raised above the street level. The protruding edge, the center of which is placed on a large circular base, a convex edge, on which the water slides rather than falls. The base supports a stocky and short baluster, adorned at the top with the leaves or petals relief from which flows the water and in the lower half, with a series of small tanks placed around the circumference of the banister. The latter supports a wide, central, flared basin, whose center is located in a circular base just higher than the tub edge. On the base are four large sitting nude female figures, caryatids, supporting the arms. At the center of the water gushes from a big pine cone.

The inauguration was originally scheduled for 21 April 1928, but had to be postponed until May 9. The controversy soon subsided, because the fascist government in general supported the use of nude statues that soon adorned many official buildings.

== Church of St. Joachim ==
Near the square stands the church of St. Joachim, completed in 1898 by architect Raffaele Ingami. Its purpose was to solemnize the priestly and episcopal jubilee of Leo XIII.

Preceded by Fontane di Piazza Farnese	Landmarks of Rome; Fontana della Piazza dei Quiriti	Succeeded by Fontana di Piazza Nicosia
