= Fontanone di Ponte Sisto =

Fountain in Rome, Italy

- Fountain
- {{{other_names}}}
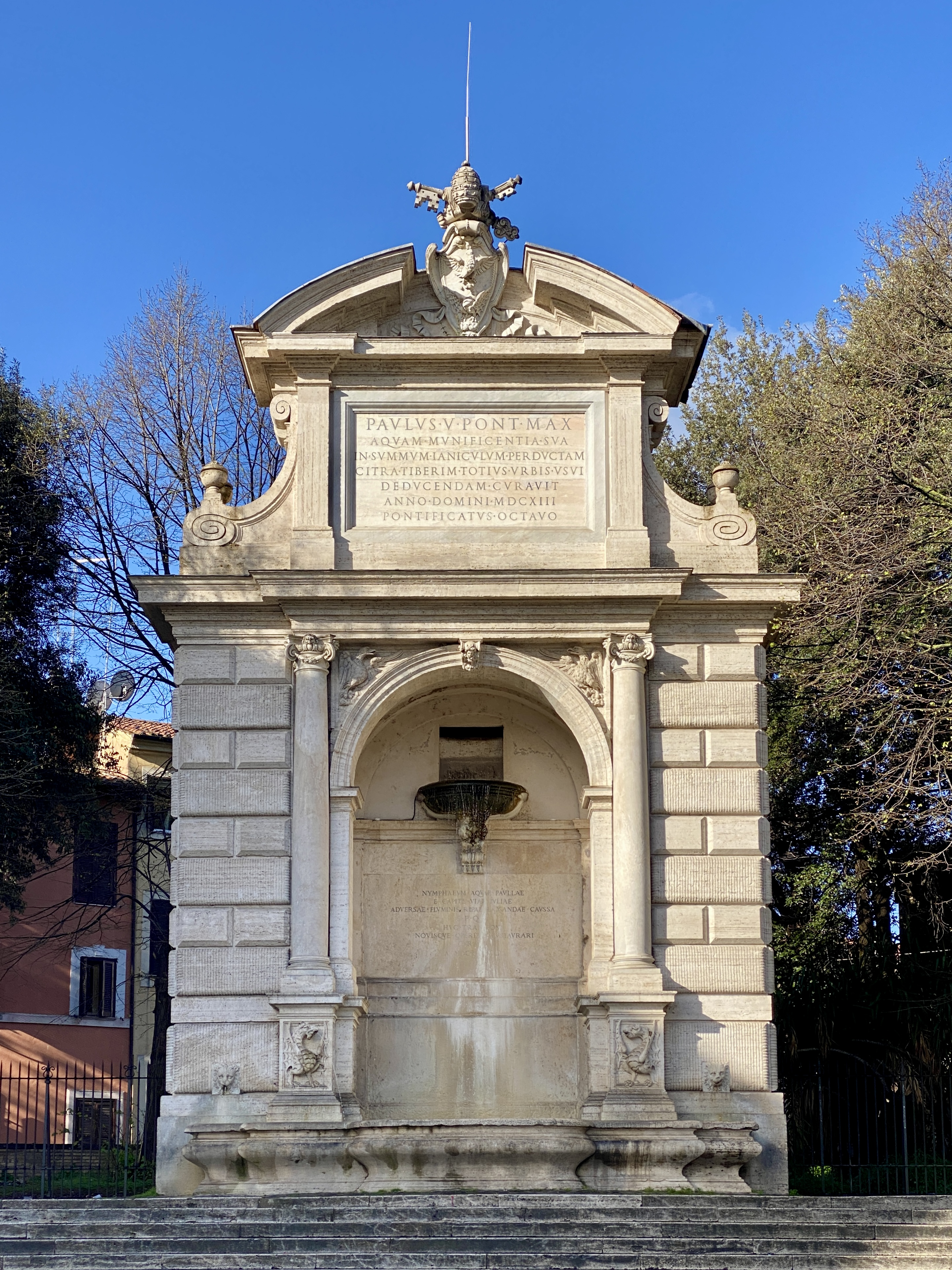
- Fountain today in Piazza Trilussa
- Location: Rome
- Interactive map of Fontanone di Ponte Sisto
- Coordinates: 41°53′30″N 12°28′11″E

The Fontana or Fontanone di Ponte Sisto, once known as the Fontanone dei Cento Preti, is an early 17th-century, monumental fountain now located in Piazza Trilussa, facing the south end of the Ponte Sisto, in Trastevere, Rome, Italy. It was reconstructed here in the late 19th century, originally erected across the river, attached to the former building of the Collegio Ecclesiastico.

== History ==
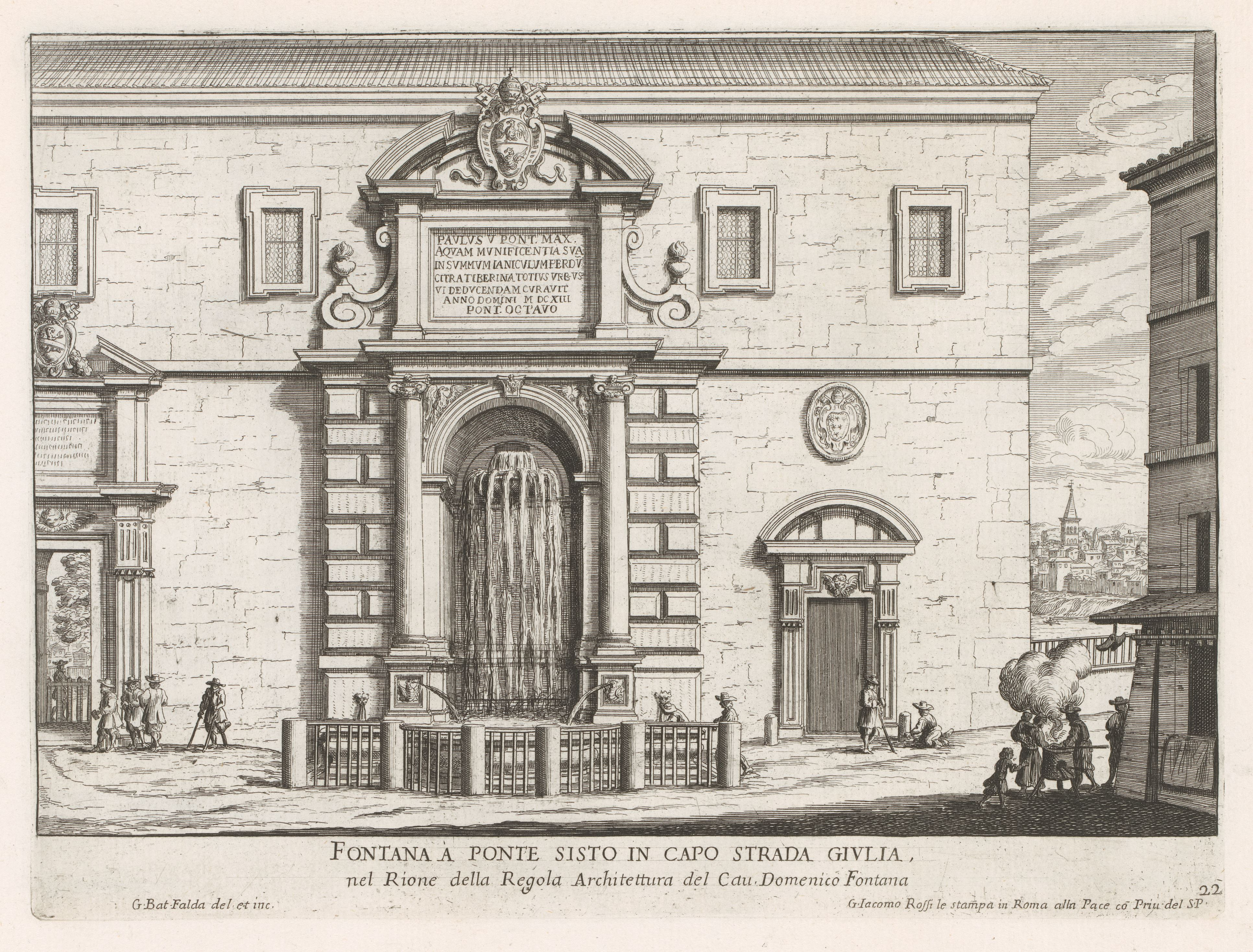
The fountain in its original position at the southern end of the via Giulia (Giovanni Battista Falda, 1691)

In 1587, a hospice for the indigent was established at the north end of the Ponte Sisto by Pope Sixtus V. The building, erected by Domenico Fontana, and included a large chapel or church (no longer extant), dedicated to St Francis of Assisi (San Francesco a Ponte Sisto or San Francesco ai Mendicanti). Originally called the Ospizio dei Mendicanti, the uses of this hospice building altered over the centuries. In the early 1700s, under Pope Clement XI, the male beggars were moved to the hospice at San Michele a Ripa, and a section of the building, entered through the present Via delle Zoccolette, became the hospice or conservatory for the Zitelle Mendicanti (maidens or girls who were beggars). This hospice, called the Zoccolette was established under Pope Innocent XII, and functioned into the 19th century, when it was renamed the Conservatorio di Santi Clemente e Crescentino under the administration by the Padri delle Scuole Pie (Piarists). The name Zoccolette was likely derived from the clog, zoccolo, given to the girls to shoe their feet. The portion of the building accessed from the Via dei Pettinari (where it intersected with Via Giulia) became a hospice for indigent retired priests (Ospicio dei Centi Preti), and later became a seminary, the Collegio Ecclesiastico. In the mid-19th century, part of this unit functioned as a military hospital.

== Design ==
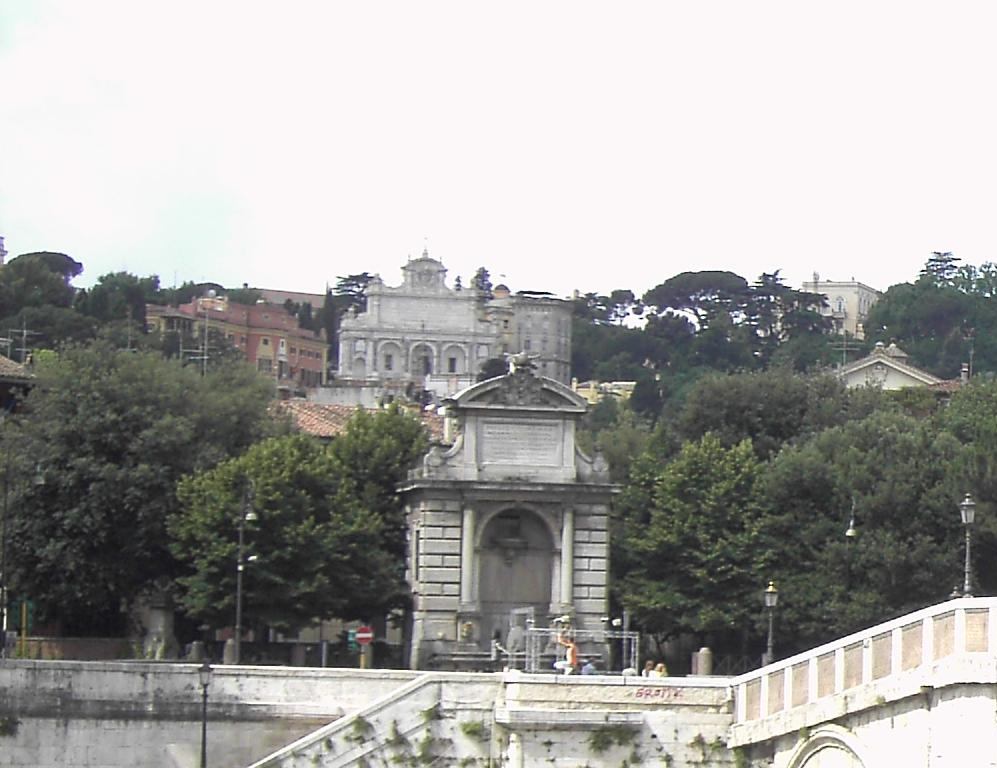
View shows present relationship of fountain (below) to the fountatin of Acqua Paola (higher up on the Janiculum hill)

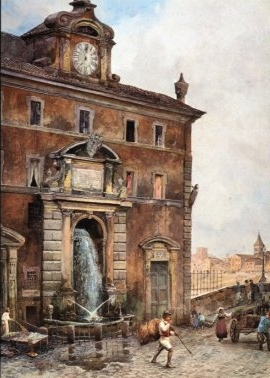
Depiction of fountain (mid-19th-century) showing relationship to bridge prior to demolition

It was to this latter seminary building, located in rione Regula, that the administration of Pope Paul V (Borghese) decided to build this fountain, in which to funnel water from the Acqua Paola on the Janiculum, across the river through pipes carried by the Ponte Sisto. The fountain built of stone and travertine marble discharged water from various sites: the top basin (still present but no longer participating in hydraulics) was filled by jets above, and then overflowed to the larger basin below. Additionally, water spouted from both the mouths of two lion faces and from dragons (symbols of the Borghese family) carved in to the pedestal of the column bases. The engineering was carried out by Giovanni Vasanzio and Flaminio Ponzio, and the fountain, attached to the façade of the building, was designed by Giovanni Fontana. Previously, the area in front of the fountain was called Piazza San Vincenzo Pallotti. The cost of making the fountain was almost 4000 scudi, estimated in 2006 to be the equivalent of 4 million euros.

The fountain at the north bank was disassembled in the late 19th century. During the occupation of Rome by Napoleonic forces in the early 19th century, the papal symbol atop the fountain was removed. By the 1870s, the northern banks flanking the Tiber, a strip of land prone to flooding, were cleared in order to build the Lungotevere, leading to the dismantlement of the fountain in 1879, many of the stones were used for landfill. Over the next decades, this was viewed as an act of cultural hubris, and disrespect for this monument. The council of Rome decided to re-erect the fountain in its new location in 1898, even though the architect Angelo Vescovali could only find about half the original stones of the monument. The fountain, now facing the bridge from the opposite bank, is a busy park.

Preceded by Fountain in Piazza Santa Maria in Trastevere	Landmarks of Rome; Fontanone di Ponte Sisto	Succeeded by Fontana dei Quattro Fiumi
