= Piazza Trilussa =

Urban square in Rome

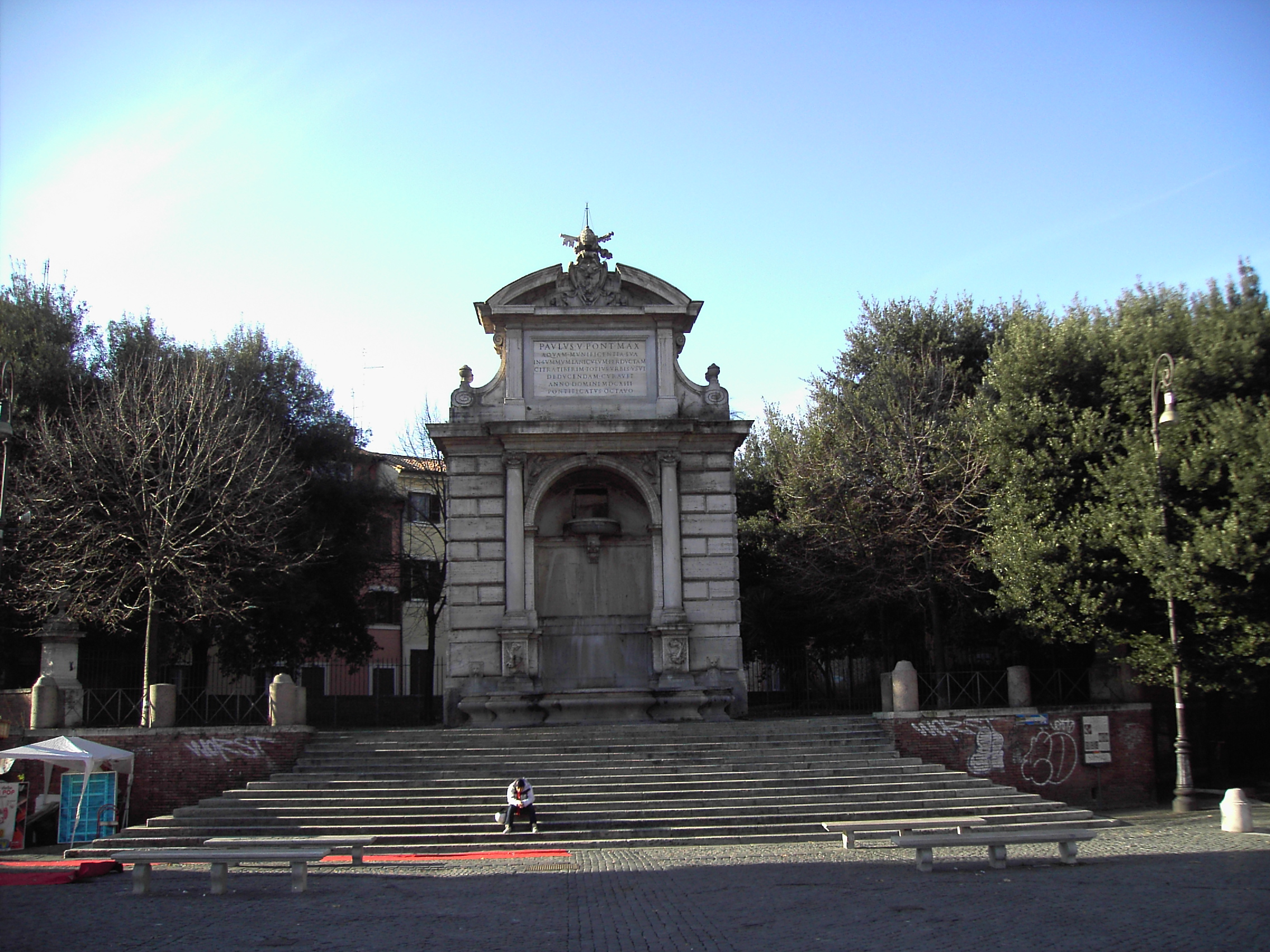
Piazza Trilussa with the Fontanone di Ponte Sisto.

Piazza Trilussa is an urban square in the neighbourhood Trastevere of Rome. Its name honours the Roman poet Carlo Alberto Salustri, better known by the anagram of his surname, Trilussa.

On the northwest side of the piazza, there is a statue in honor of Carlo Alberto Salustri who is known for his ironic poems critiquing corrupt politicians.

The monumental fountain Fontanone di Ponte Sisto dominates the centre of the square, facing the notable Ponte Sisto on the nearby Lungotevere. The fountain was designed to resemble and reference the Acqua Paola fountain positioned on the top of nearby Janiculum Hill.
