= Fountain in Piazza Santa Maria in Trastevere =

Fountain in Rome, Italy

- Fountain
- {{{other_names}}}
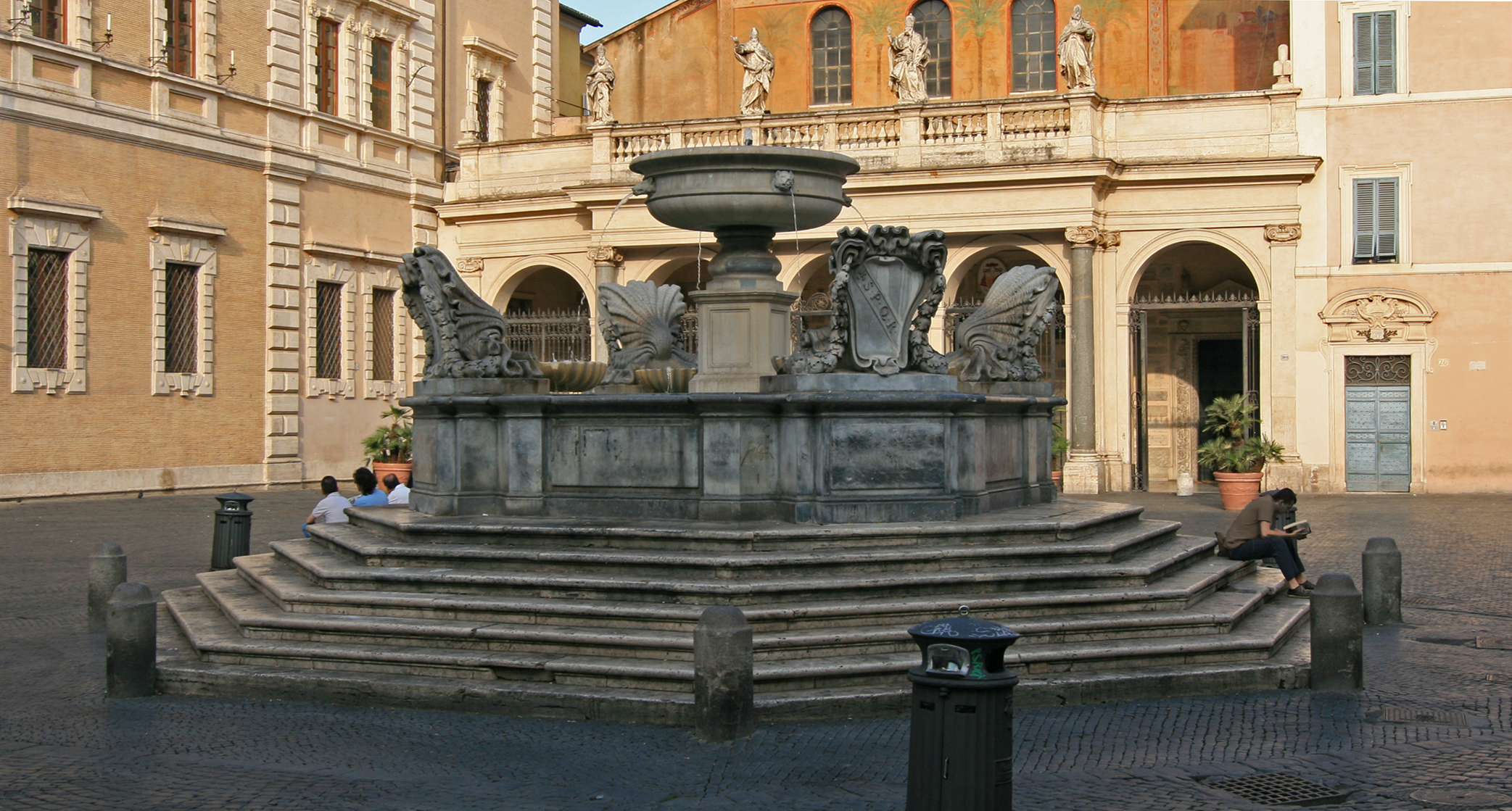
- Fountain in Piazza Santa Maria in Trastevere
- Design: Donato Bramante
- Location: Piazza Santa Maria, Rome, Italy
- Interactive map of Fountain in Piazza Santa Maria in Trastevere
- Coordinates: 41°54′11.1″N 12°28′28.65″E

The Fountain in Piazza Santa Maria in Trastevere is a fountain located in the square in front of the church of Santa Maria in Trastevere, Rome, Italy. It is believed to be the oldest fountain in Rome, dating back, according to some sources, to the 8th century. The present fountain is the work of Donato Bramante, with later additions by Gian Lorenzo Bernini and Carlo Fontana.

== History ==
A fountain is believed to have stood in this square since the 8th century, but the exact date it was built is unknown. A drawing of the fountain appears on the map of Rome made by Pietro del Massaio in 1471, along with a description of the legend of the fountain's origin. According to the legend, which appears in the Chronicle of Eusebius, translated and finished by Saint Jerome in the fifth century, on the night of the birth of Christ a fountain of oil appeared miraculously in front of the church, which as a result was given the name "Santa Maria in fontibus." The original fountain was supplied with water by a Roman aqueduct, the Aqua Traiana. When the aqueduct was ruined during the invasions of Rome, water came from underground sources below the Janiculum hill. The old fountain illustrated in the drawing of del Massaio had two vasques, one above the other, pouring water into the basin below.

The fountain was reconstructed between 1499 and 1500 on the command of Giovanni Lopez, the bishop of Perouse and Bishop of the parish of Santa Maria in Trastevere, who gave the commission to Donato Bramante, the architect of St. Peter's Basilica. Bramante removed the upper vasque and added four carved stone wolf heads, the emblem of the Lopez family. It became the model for many other fountains in Rome.

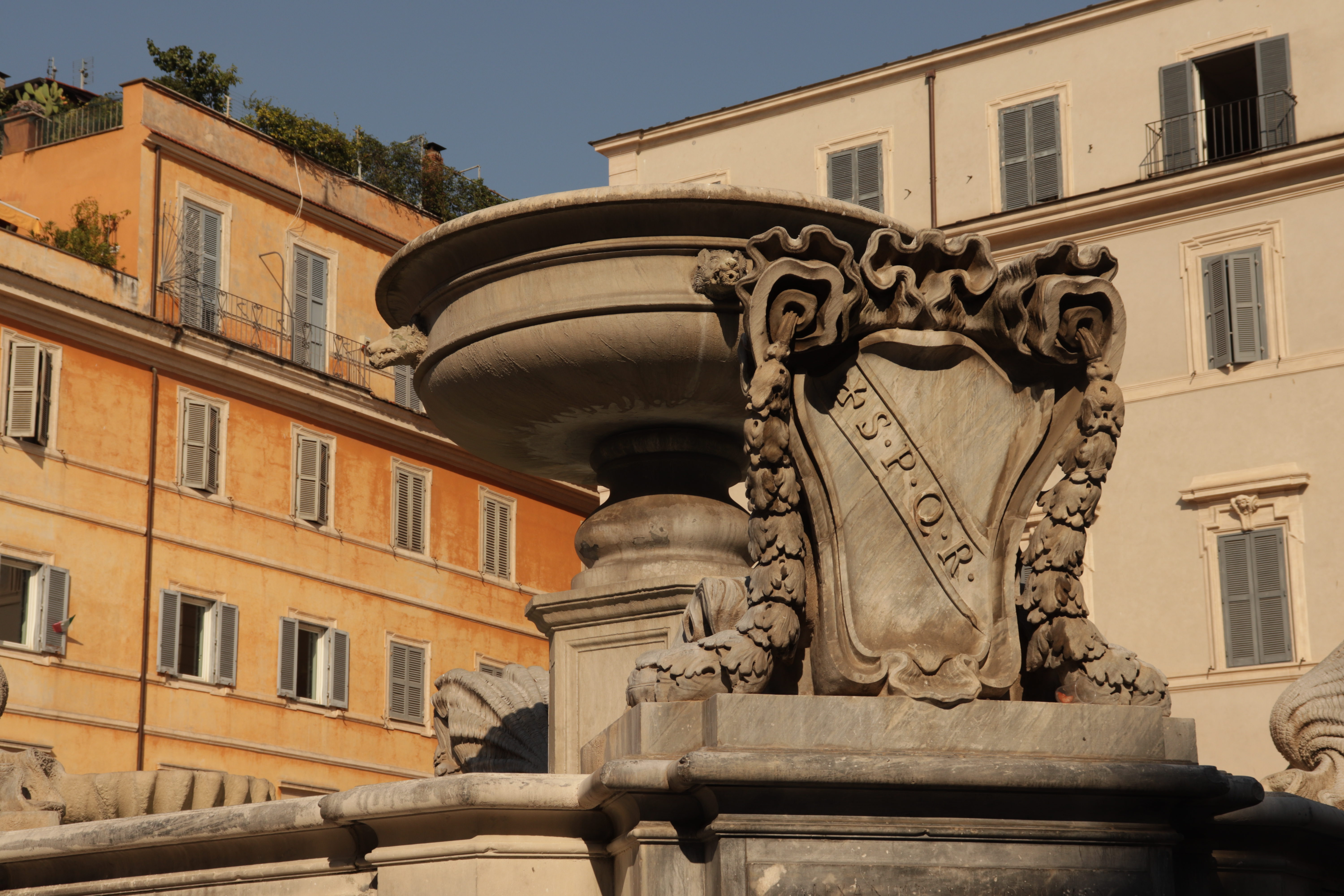
Fontana di piazza Santa Maria in Trastevere

The fountain was reconstructed again in 1604 by the architect Girolamo Rainaldi, the father of Carlo Rainaldi, the architect of the two churches of Piazza del Popolo. At that time the fountain was connected to the newly restored Acqua Felice aqueduct. In 1659 the fountain was connected to the Acqua Paola aqueduct and remodeled again by Bernini. Bernini replaced the octagonal basin, moved the fountain from its original place in front of the church to a new location in the center of the square, and added four sculpted seashells around the basin. At the end of the 17th century, the architect Carlo Fontana replaced Bernini's seashells with his own sculpted seashells facing inward.

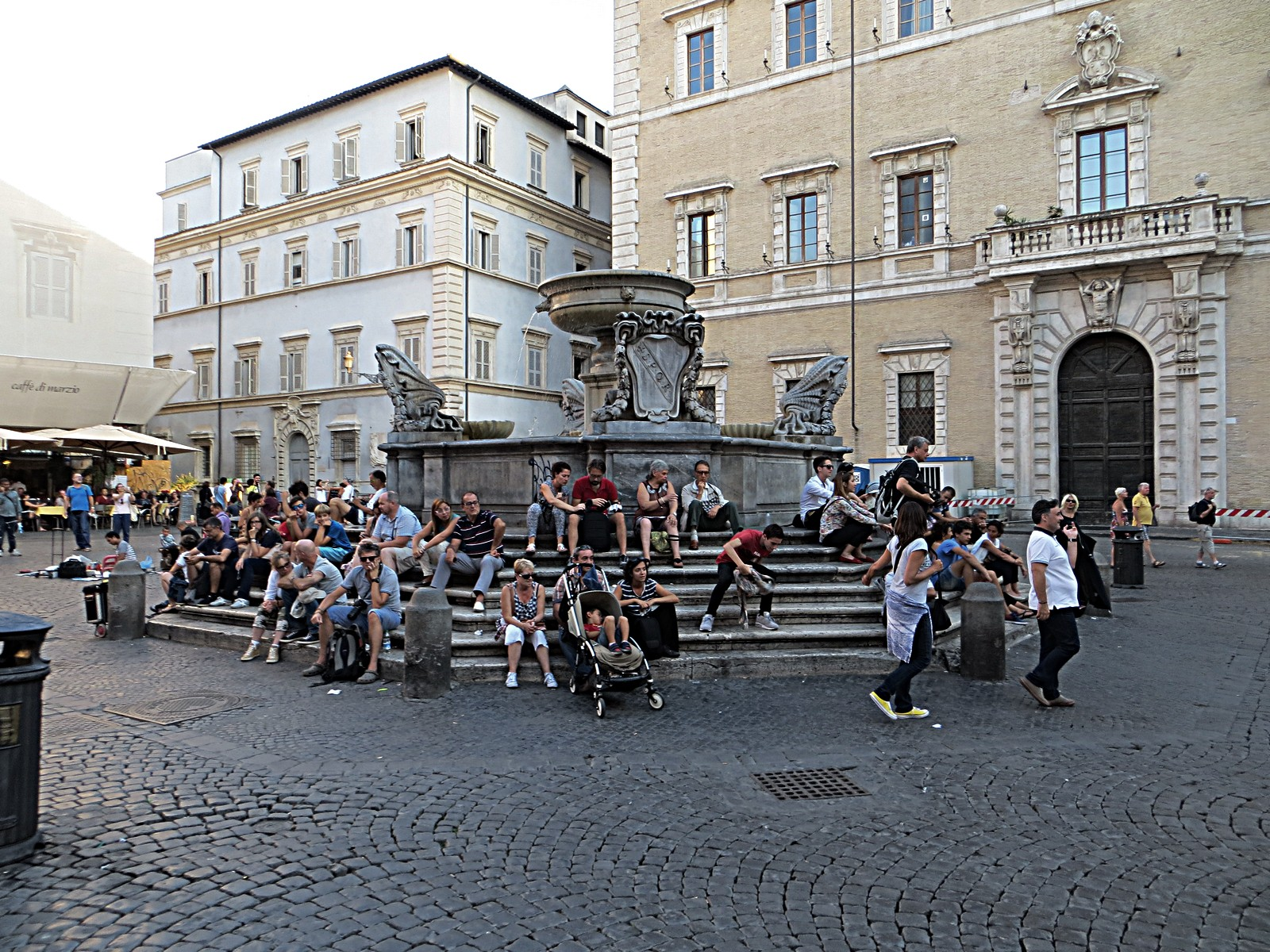
Fontana di Piazza S.Maria in Trastevere

The fountain was completely rebuilt in 1873, following the design of Bernini and Fontana, but using less expensive materials. In that occasion, the main pool was rebuilt with bardiglio marble and an imposing S.P.Q.R. sign has been placed on the external side of the shells. It was rebuilt once again in 1930. The last maintenance has been made in 1984.

While the piazza may be fairly quiet during the day, in the evening people gather around the fountain, sitting on the steps.

== Bibliography ==
- Maurizia Tazartes, Fontaines de Rome, (French edition translated from Italian), Citadelles & Mazenot, Paris, 2004
- Marilyn Symmes, Editor, Fountains - Splash and Spectacle, Water and Design from the Renaissance to the Present, Thames and Hudson, in association with Cooper-Hewitt National Design Museum and the Smithsonian Institution, 1998.

Preceded by Fontana di Piazza Nicosia	Landmarks of Rome; Fountain in Piazza Santa Maria in Trastevere	Succeeded by Fontanone di Ponte Sisto
