= Fontana di Piazza Nicosia =

Fountain in Rome

- Fountain
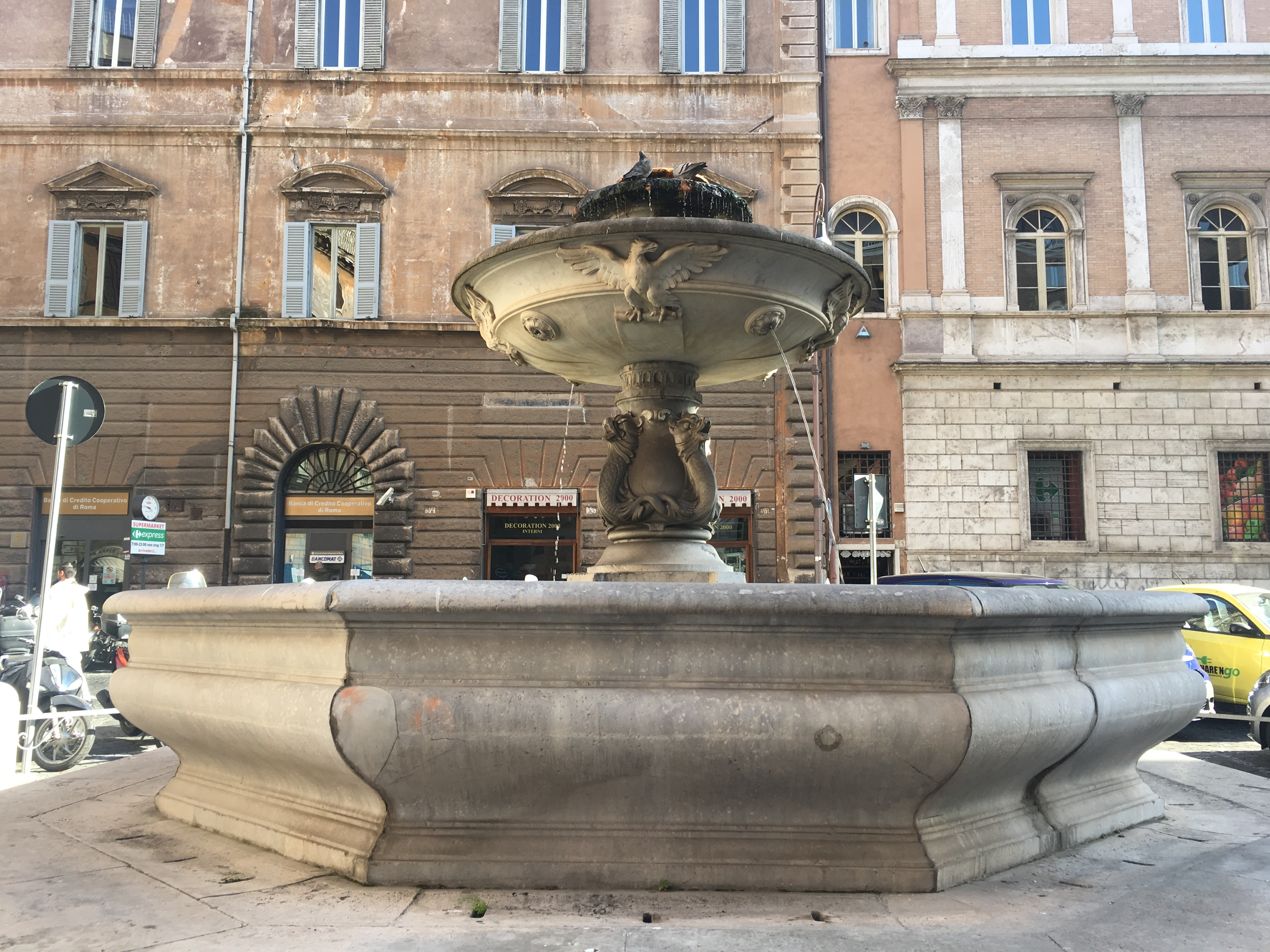
- Fontana di Piazza Nicosia, March 2019
- Design: Giacomo della Porta
- Location: Rome
- Interactive map of Fontana di Piazza Nicosia
- Coordinates: 41°54′11.1″N 12°28′28.65″E

The Fontana di Piazza Nicosia is a fountain in Rome, Italy, is the first of the modern fountains of Rome. It is located in the square with the same name.

== History ==
Built in 1572 after the re-activation of the Acqua Vergine aqueduct, it was designed by Giacomo della Porta, and was originally located in the Piazza del Popolo around the obelisk.

=== Redesign ===
In 1823, however, after the fountain was judged to be too small for the size of the piazza, Giuseppe Valadier designed a new fountain for the Popolo, that consisted of four mini-fountains of lions surrounding the obelisk, that can be seen today, and the fountain was moved to its final position in the Piazza Nicosia. Of the original fountain, however, only the large octagonal marble basin is original; the upper baluster and display bowl was a later construction.

=== Remnants ===
The original design included four Tritons, however, once sculpted, they were judged to be too large for the size of the basin, and so became part of the Fontana del Moro.

When it was decided in 1940 to bring the fountain back into use, the two upper basins—which had been lost in the meantime—had to be reconstructed on the basis of a detailed 17th-century print. In 1950, the new fountain was reassembled and placed in its current location in Piazza Nicosia.

Preceded by Fontana della Piazza dei Quiriti	Landmarks of Rome; Fontana di Piazza Nicosia	Succeeded by Fountain in Piazza Santa Maria in Trastevere
