= Ponte Sisto =

Ancient Roman bridge in Rome

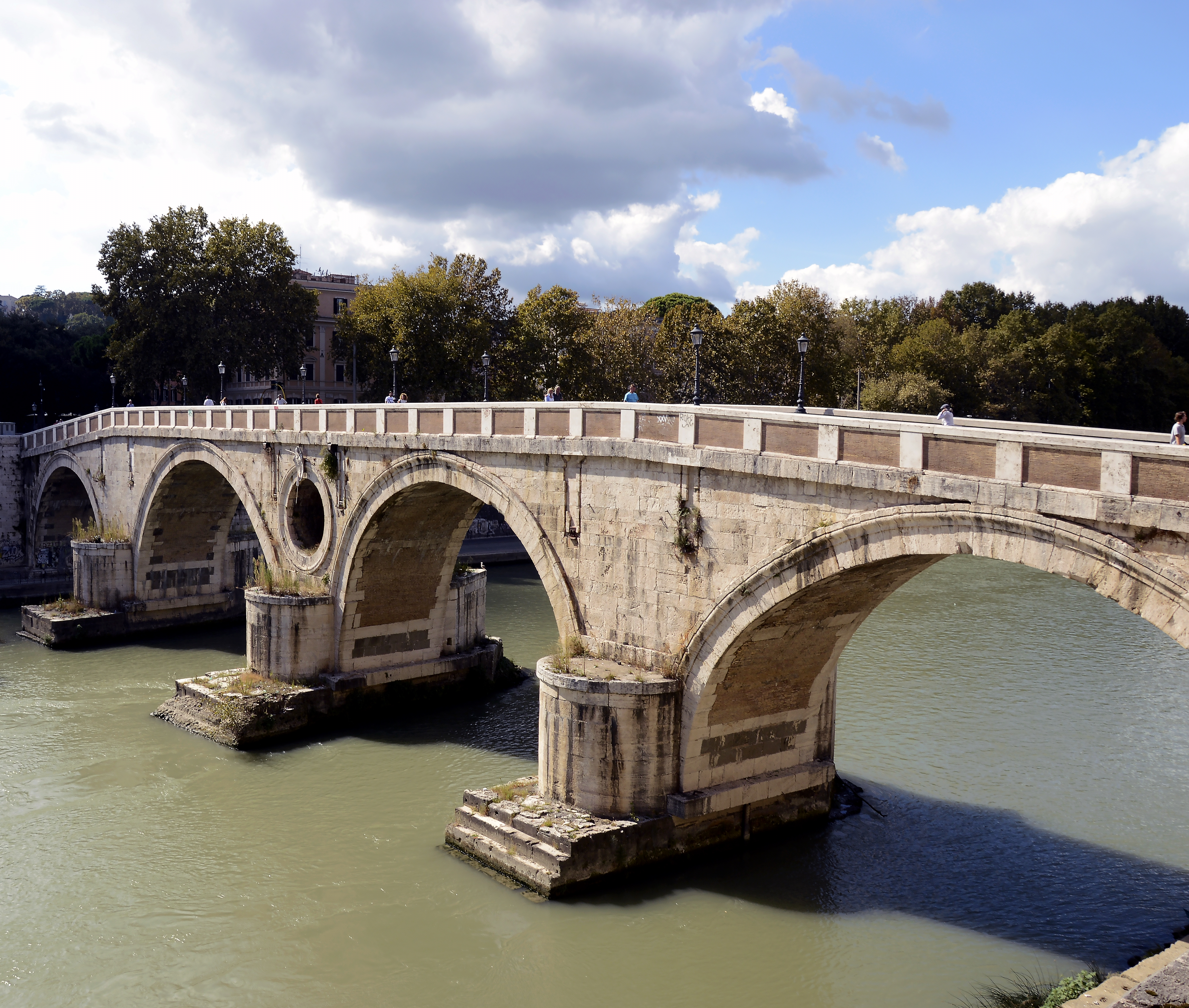
- Ponte Sisto
- Coordinates: 41°53′32.4″N 12°28′14.7″E
- Crosses: Tiber River
- Locale: Rome, Italy
- Named for: Pope Sixtus IV

Location
- Click on the map for a fullscreen view

Ponte Sisto is a bridge in Rome's historic centre, spanning the river Tiber. It connects Via dei Pettinari in the Rione of Regola to Piazza Trilussa in Trastevere.

== History ==
The construction of the current bridge occurred between 1473 and 1479, and was commissioned by Pope Sixtus IV (r. 1471–84), after whom it is named, from the architect Baccio Pontelli, who reused the foundations of a prior Roman bridge, the Pons Aurelius, which is also known as Pons Antoninus and had been destroyed during the early Middle Ages. Currently traffic on the bridge is restricted to pedestrians. According to Mandell Creighton's History of the Papacy, the Sistine Bridge was built of blocks from the Colosseum and that, further, Sixtus was mindful of the disaster that had occurred in the Jubilee of 1450 through the crowding of the Bridge of S. Angelo, which was the only available means of communication with St. Peter's.

== Roman Pons Aurelius ==
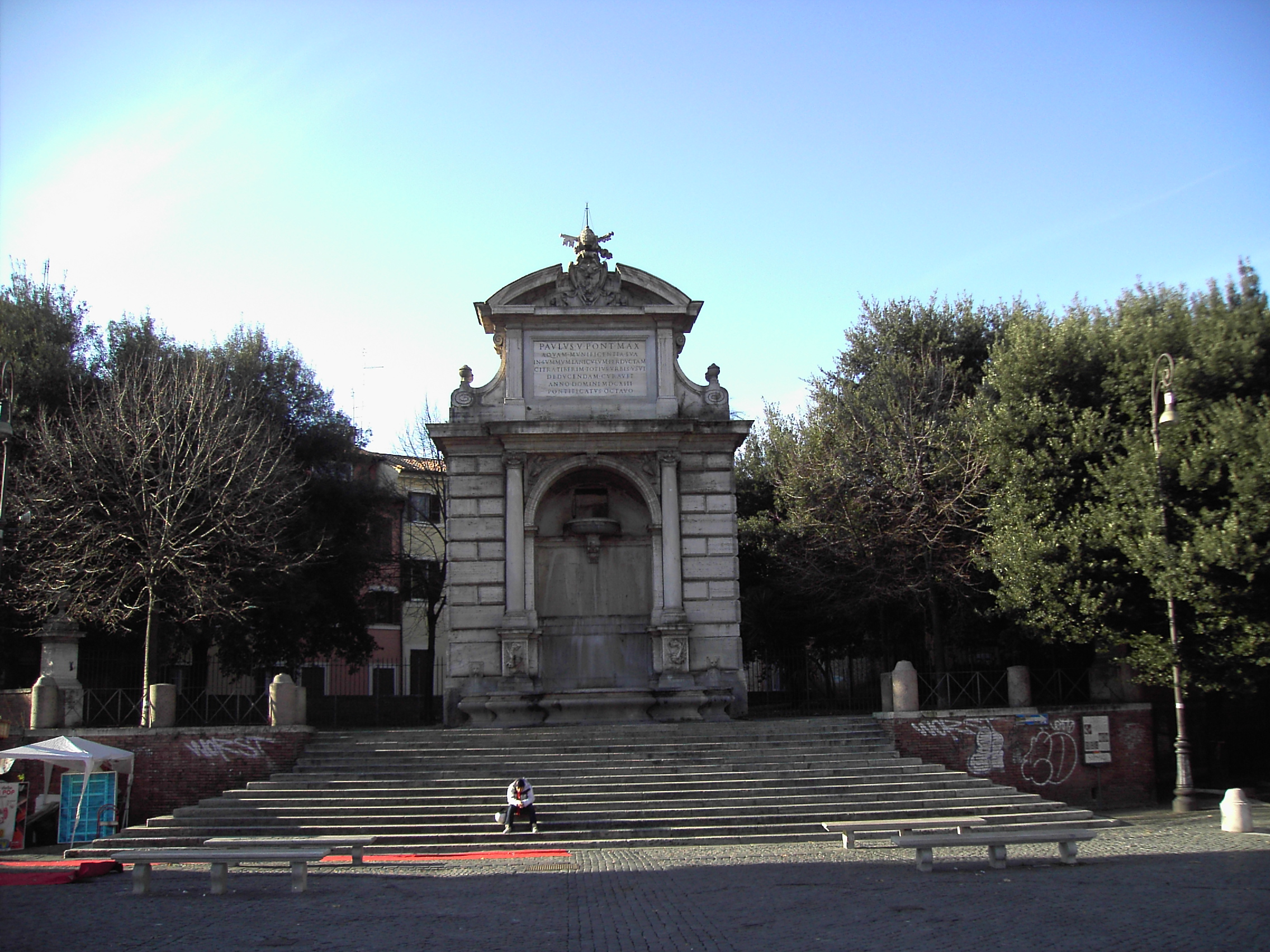
The Fontanone di Ponte Sisto (1612) presently in Piazza Trilussa, facing the bridge at the south bank of the Tiber.

The predecessor bridge to Ponte Sisto, the Pons Aurelius, was first mentioned by authors in the 4th and 5th centuries and was later known in the Middle Ages as "Pons Antoninus," "Pons Antonini in Arenula," and "Pons Ianicularis id est pons ruptus vulgariter nominatus et Tremelus et Antoninus."

The Pons Antoninus was partially destroyed in 772, at the time the Lombard king Desiderius took Rome, and rebuilt in its current form by Pope Sixtus IV, whose name it carries to this day.

== Renaissance Ponte Sisto ==
The bridge is architecturally characteristic because of the "oculus" or eye lightening the masonry of its central spandrel: this was erected to diminish the river's pressure on the bridge in case of flood.

On the left bridge head are placed the copies of two marble slabs (removed in the 1990s after continued vandalism) bearing an elegant Latin inscription composed by Renaissance humanist Bartolomeo Platina in honour of Sixtus IV in occasion of the construction of the bridge. They recite:

XYSTVS IIII PONT MAX
AD VTILITATEM P RO PEREGRINAEQVE MVLTI
TVDINIS AD JVBILAEVM VENTVRAE PONTEM
HVNC QVEM MERITO RVPTVM VOCABANT A FVN
DAMENTIS MAGNA CVRA ET IMPENSA RESTI
TVIT XYSTVMQVE SVO DE NOMINE APPELLARI VOLVIT

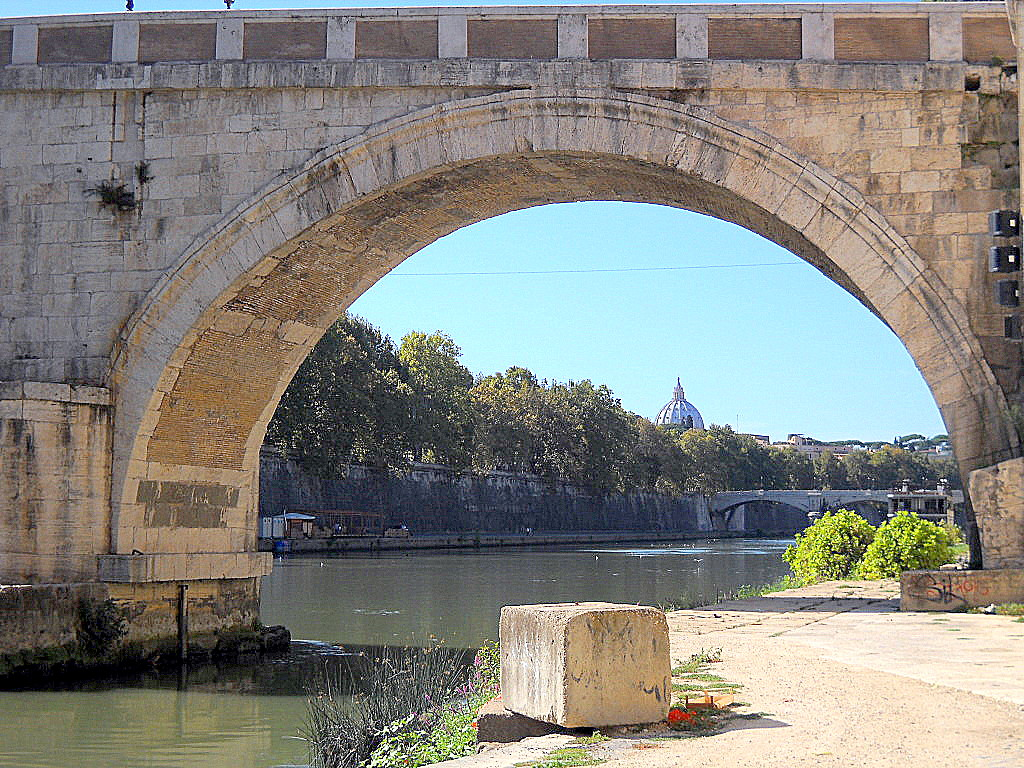
Detail of an arch

and

MCCCCLXXV
QVI TRANSIS XYST QVARTI BENEFICIO
DEVM ROGA VT PONTEFICEM OPTIMVM MAXI
MVM DIV NOBIS SALVET AC SOSPITET BENE
VALE QVISQVIS ES VBI HAEC PRECATVS
FVERIS

On the corner of via dei Pettinari and via Giulia once stood a fountain (the Fontanone di Ponte Sisto or dei Cento Preti), which relayed water from the great fountain called the Acqua Paola, derived originally from a Roman aqueduct brought back to working order by Pope Paul V (r. 1605–21): the water was brought from Lake Bracciano to Trastevere and from there over the Ponte Sisto to the Campo Marzio. The bridge still carries the water of the Acqua Paola across the river in eight large pipes.

== Baroque and Modern age ==
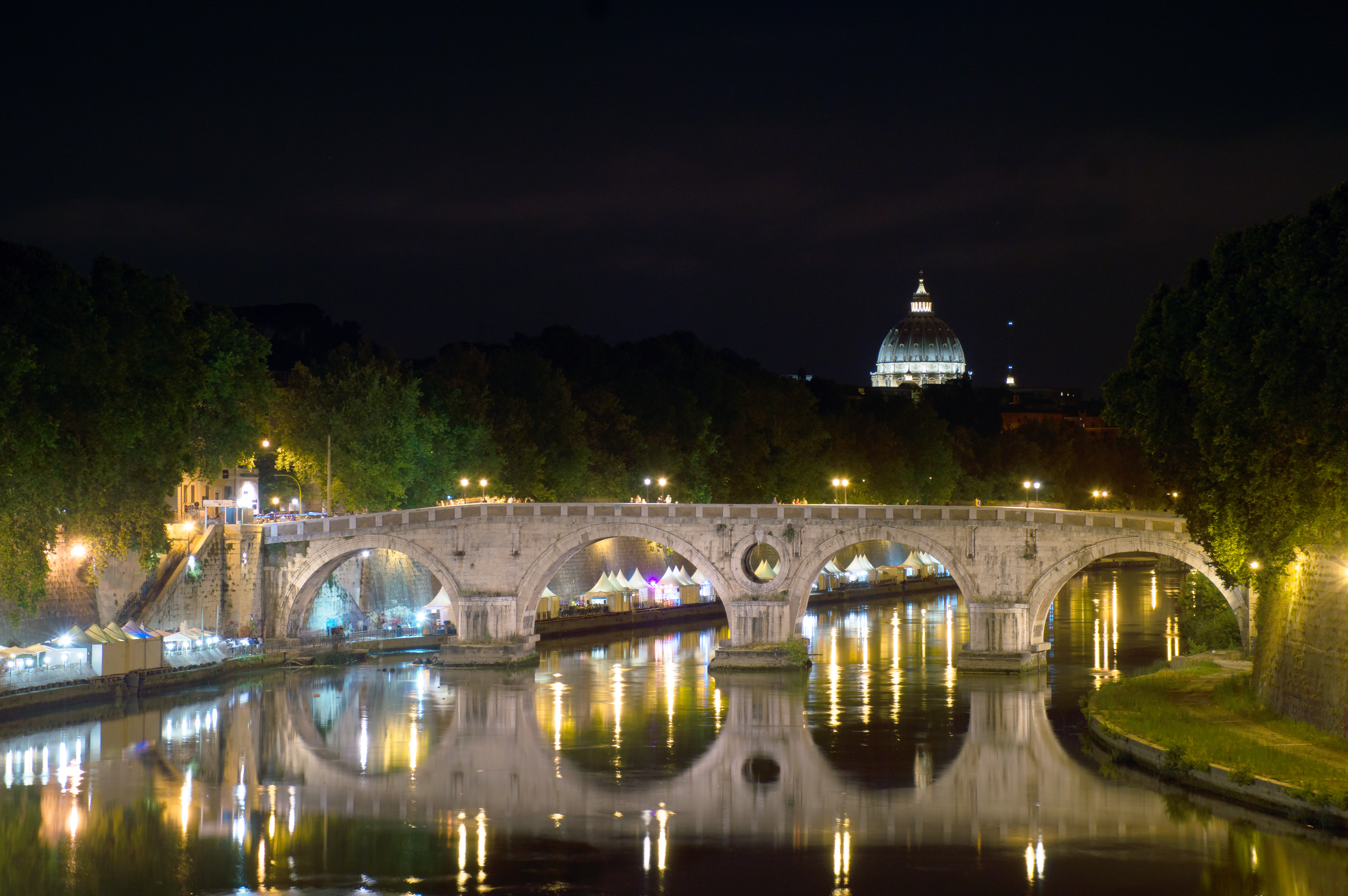
The bridge at night with Saint Peter's dome in background

On 20 August 1662, a brawl erupting between some Corsican soldiers controlling the bridge and Frenchmen belonging to the retinue of the French ambassador triggered the Corsican Guard Affair and had as effect the disbanding of the Corsican Guard, a corp of mercenaries originating from the island having police duties in Rome.

After the Unification of Italy in 1870, the buildings surrounding the mostra dell'acqua paola were destroyed for the erection of the Lungotevere along the river side, and the fountain itself was relocated to Piazza Trilussa on the other side of the bridge, where it delivers water to this day.

In 1877, two large cast-iron pedestrian gangways resting on marble consoles were added to the sides of the bridge. After considerable controversies, Rome's mayor Francesco Rutelli let them be demolished in 2000, restoring Ponte Sisto's pristine silhouette, and since then traffic on the bridge has been restricted to pedestrians.

The Ponte Sisto connects the lively and popular Campo de' Fiori area (reached through via dei Pettinari) and via Giulia with Piazza Trilussa in Trastevere across the river, where many young Romans and tourists gather for an aperitivo on a Friday night.

| Preceded by Torre delle Milizie | Landmarks of Rome; Ponte Sisto | Succeeded by Spanish Steps |
