= Abaco =

Abaco is a variant Italian form of the Biblical name "Habakkuk" (but normally Abacùc or Abacucco).

Abaco may refer to:

== People ==
- Evaristo Felice Dall'Abaco (1675–1742), Italian composer and violinist
- Joseph Abaco (1710–1805), Belgian composer and violoncellist

== Places ==
- Abaco Islands, part of the northern Bahamas
  - North Abaco
  - Central Abaco
  - South Abaco
  - Abaco National Park

== Other uses ==
- Abaco (web browser), the web browser
- Abaco Air, Bahamian airline
- Abaco Dream, American rock music group
- Abaco Independence Movement, separatist organization on the Abaco islands

== See also ==
- Abacus (disambiguation)
