= Scrutinium Physico-Medicum =

1658 work by Athanasius Kircher

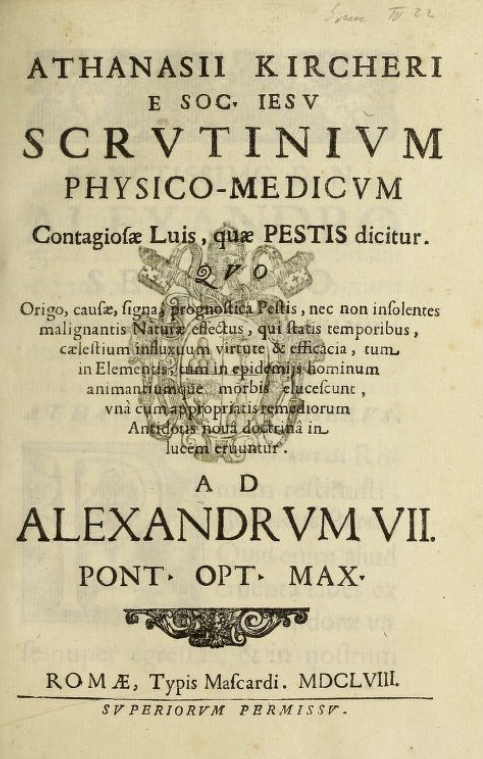
Title page of Kircher's Scrutinium Physico-Medicum

Scrutinium Physico-Medicum Contagiosae Luis, Quae Pestis Dicitur (A Physico-Medical Examination of the Contagious Pestilence Called the Plague) is a 1658 work by the Jesuit scholar Athanasius Kircher, containing his observations and theories about the bubonic plague that struck Rome in the summer of 1656. Kircher was the first person to view infected blood through a microscope, and his observations are described in the book. The work was printed on the presses of Vitale Mascardi and dedicated to Pope Alexander VII.

Kircher attributed the plague to microscopic 'worms' which appeared due to spontaneous generation, and which infected various organisms through the food chain process. Already infected plants would infect the animals that ate them, and the infected animals would infect the humans who ate them. Kircher explained his findings through a series of experiments, but Francesco Redi later concluded that there was no reproducibility in these experiments. Redi had attempted to reproduce the experiments which Kircher described, and noted that there was no actual evidence for spontaneous generation in the results. On the other hand, Kircher popularized the idea "that contagion was the method of disease transmission". Kircher's work was discussed by the Royal Society, and the concept of contagion was soon adopted by several English thinkers.

== Background ==
The plague outbreak in Rome in 1656 killed around 15,000 people in four months. During this period Kircher undertook experiments to try and understand the disease better although there is no evidence that he was directly involved in the medical treatment of the sick. Kircher's previous work, Itinerarium exstaticum had caused trouble with the Jesuit censors and stirred up controversy. Writing about the plague gave him an opportunity to compliment the new pope, Alexander VII, and move attention away from a work that had caused him difficulties.

The Jesuit Order had a long-established practice of not writing about medical topics. For this reason, the Jesuit censors who reviewed the book - François Duneau, François le Roy and Celidonio Arvizio - originally refused to authorise it for publication. Eventually, after the opinions of a number of medical authorities had been sought, Superior General Goschwin Nickel permitted its printing. The published work included testimonials from the distinguished medical scholars Ioannes Benedictus Sinibaldus, Paulus Zachias and Hieronymous Bardi.

== Kircher's theories ==
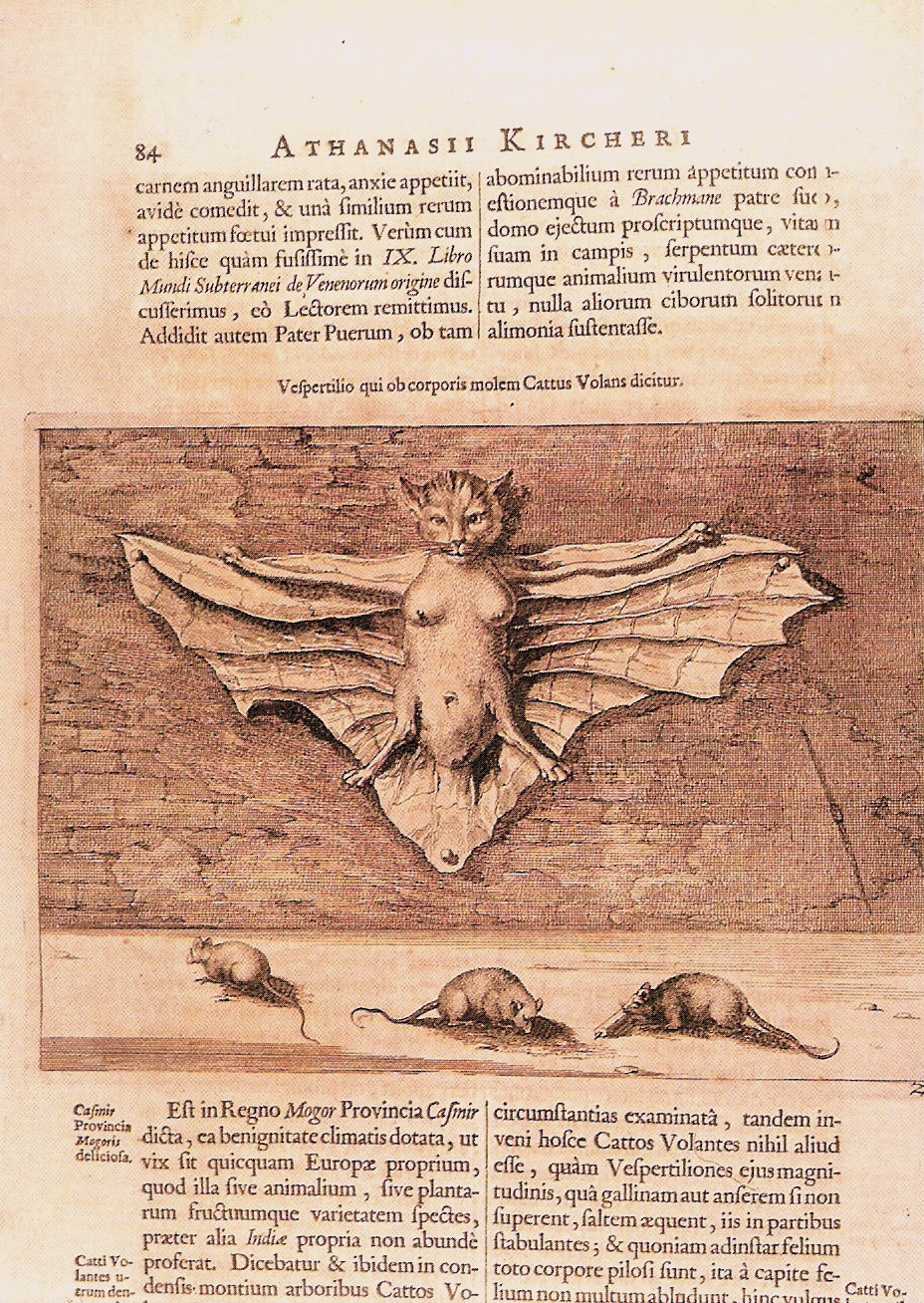
The bubonic plague by Athanasius Kircher

Kircher summarised three possible explanations for the plague. The first was the hermetic approaches of Paracelsus and Cornelius Agrippa, the second was the moral explanation for disease, and the third was medical. Kircher agreed that God did send tribulations to afflict mankind, but was most interested in medical research. In Scrutinium Physico-Medicum Kircher discussed spontaneous generation as the source of the 'worms' which caused the plague, describing experiments he did with rotting meat and with a mixture of soil and water, which produced microscopic creatures. His conclusion was that "plague in general is a living thing" and that it was transmitted by contact from one person to another.

Kircher theorised that when the ground was opened by caves and fissures, myriads of tiny creatures escaped that carried putrefaction and infected first plants, then the animals that ate them, and eventually, people. Once these creatures infected the human body, they drove out its natural heat. Once the body was chilled, the four humours were overwhelmed with putrefaction, and the victim began spreading disease in their breath.

Kircher recommended the wearing of a dead toad around the neck as a prophylactic against the plague, because he maintained that toads were a scientifically proven magnet attracting the unpleasant vapours that spread the disease.

== Significance and Reception ==
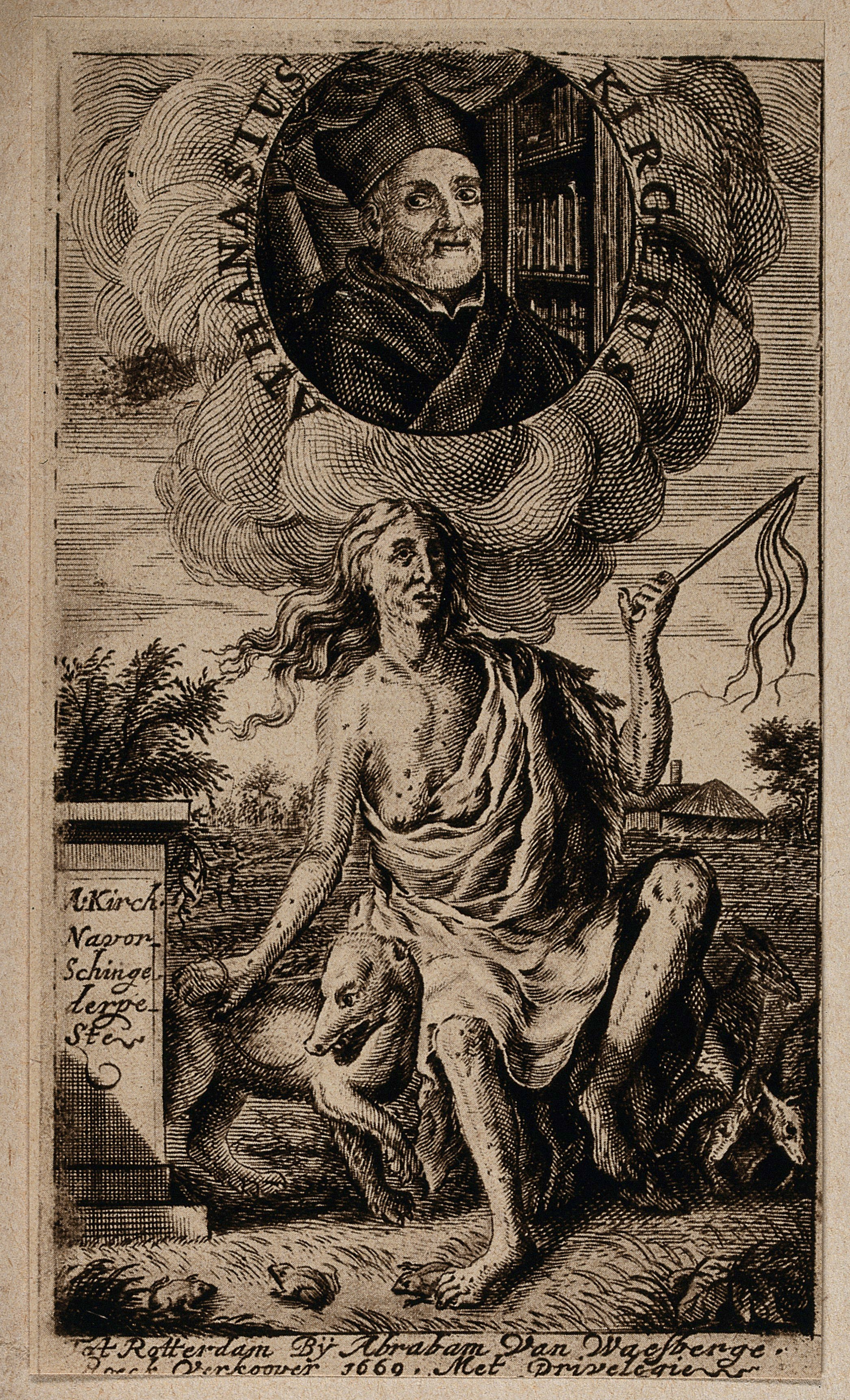
Frontispiece of Kircher's Scrutinium physico-medicum

Kircher was the first person to view infected blood through a microscope (which he called a 'smicroscopus'). Reporting that “the putrid blood of those affected by fevers... [is] so crowded with worms as to well nigh dumbfound me” he concluded that “Plague is in general a living thing”. It is not clear exactly what Kircher saw through his microscope, but it was certainly not the plague bacillus, which was not discovered until 1894.

There were critics of Kircher's ideas, such as Flaminius Gaston, who wrote that Kircher's ideas were such that few people of sound mind embraced them. Francesco Redi, a member of the Accademia del Cimento, published Esperienze Intorno alla Generazione degl'Insetti (Experiments on the Generation of Insects) in 1668. In this work he attempted to reproduce the experiments Kircher claimed to have undertaken in Scrutinium physico-medicum and found some to be unrepeatable - indeed, Redi questioned whether Kircher had ever even done them himself. Sprinking basil water on powdered scorpion did not generate baby scorpions as Kircher claimed, and he doubted that Kircher had ever successfully generated frogs by mixing ditch dust with water.

Nevertheless, Kircher's ideas were taken up by Christian Lange (1619–62), a Leipzig professor, who republished his book with his own preface. A school of medical thinking grew up around Lange and is work in Germany and elsewhere, convinced that contagion was the method of disease transmission as Kircher had argued. Kircher's work was discussed by the Royal Society, and English thinkers persuaded by his views included Frederick Slare, Sir Charles Ent and Walter Charleton. Scrutinium Physico-Medicum also influenced the thinking of Leibniz, who believed in contagion theory.

== Later editions ==
Later editions of the work were published in Leipzig by Johannes Baverus in 1659, 1671 and 1674. A Dutch translation was published in Amsterdam by Johannes van Waesbergen in 1669, and a German translation by J.C. Brandan in Augsburg in 1680. The Waesbergern translation carried a frontispiece depicting a woman covered in buboes. Above her hangs a portrait of Kircher. The wolf next to her may be a reference to the Romulus and Remus myth, symbolising Rome. She is stepping on a toad, mentioned in the book both as the product of spontaneous generation and as a protective against the plague.
