= Abul Barakat =

- Abu'l-Barakāt al-Baghdādī, a golden age philosopher
- Abul barakat ibn Kabar, a mameluke Coptic encyclopaedist
- Abul Barkat (economist), from Bangladesh
