= Prodromus Coptus =

1636 work by Athanasius Kircher

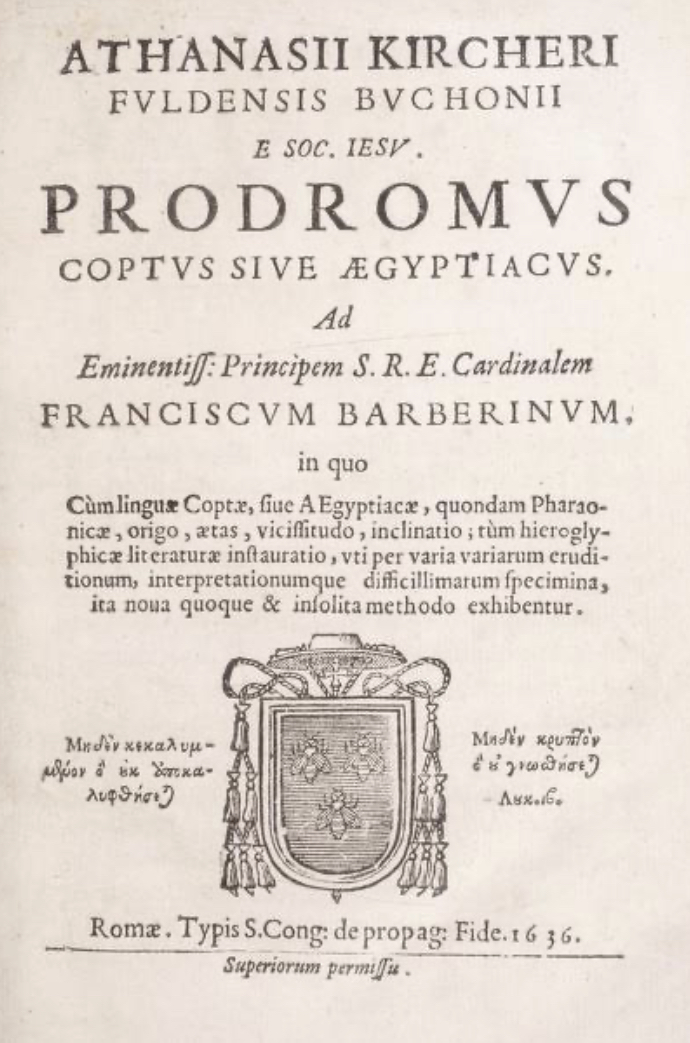
Title page of Prodromus Coptus

Prodromus Coptus sive Aegyptiacus (The Coptic or Egyptian Forerunner) was a 1636 work by the Jesuit scholar Athanasius Kircher. It was published in Rome by the Sacred Congregation for the Propagation of the Faith and dedicated to the Prefect of the Congregation, Cardinal Francesco Barberini. The book was Kircher's first venture into the field of Egyptology, and it also contained the first ever published grammar of the Coptic language.

== Background ==
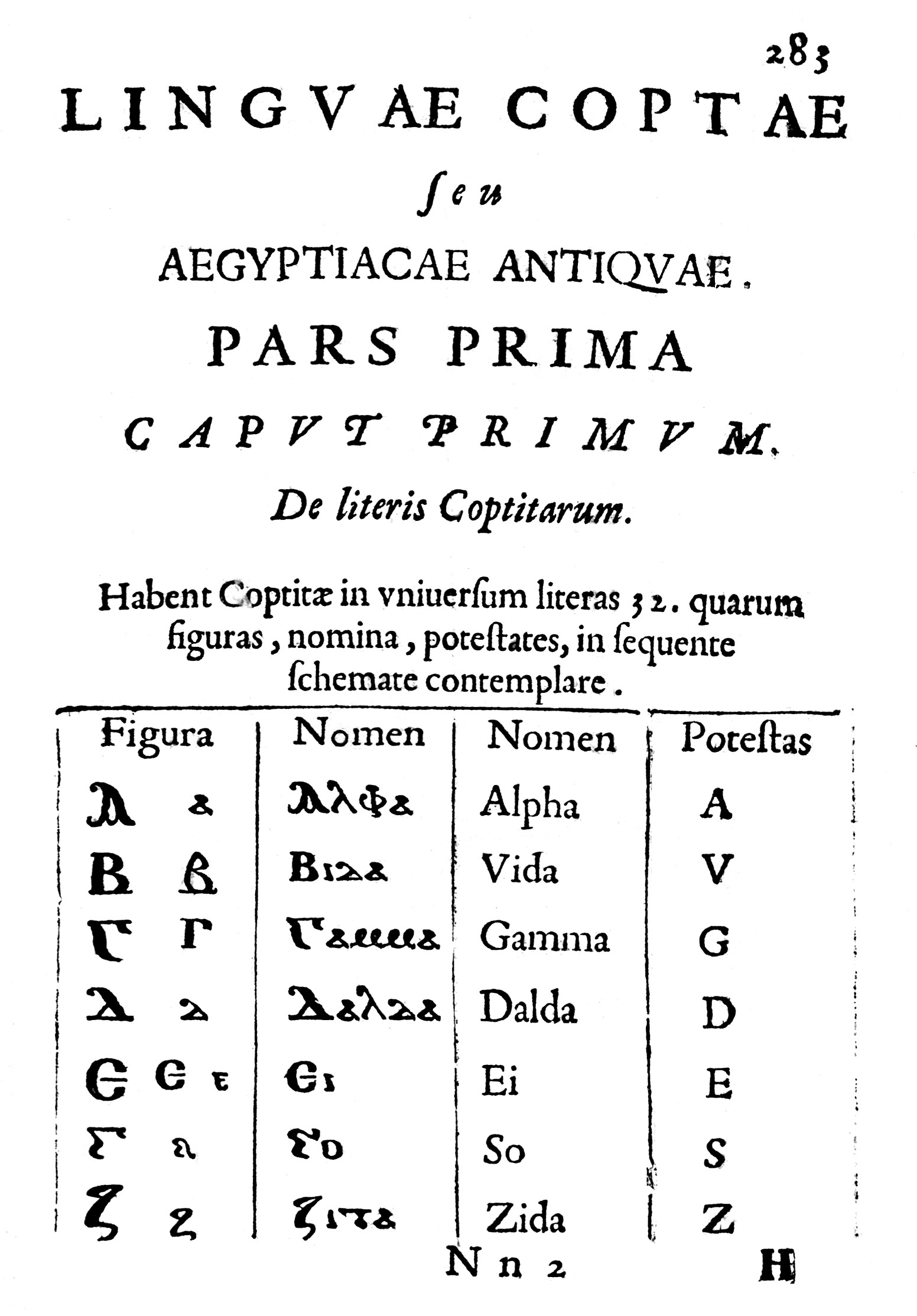
Coptic alphabet from Prodromus Coptus

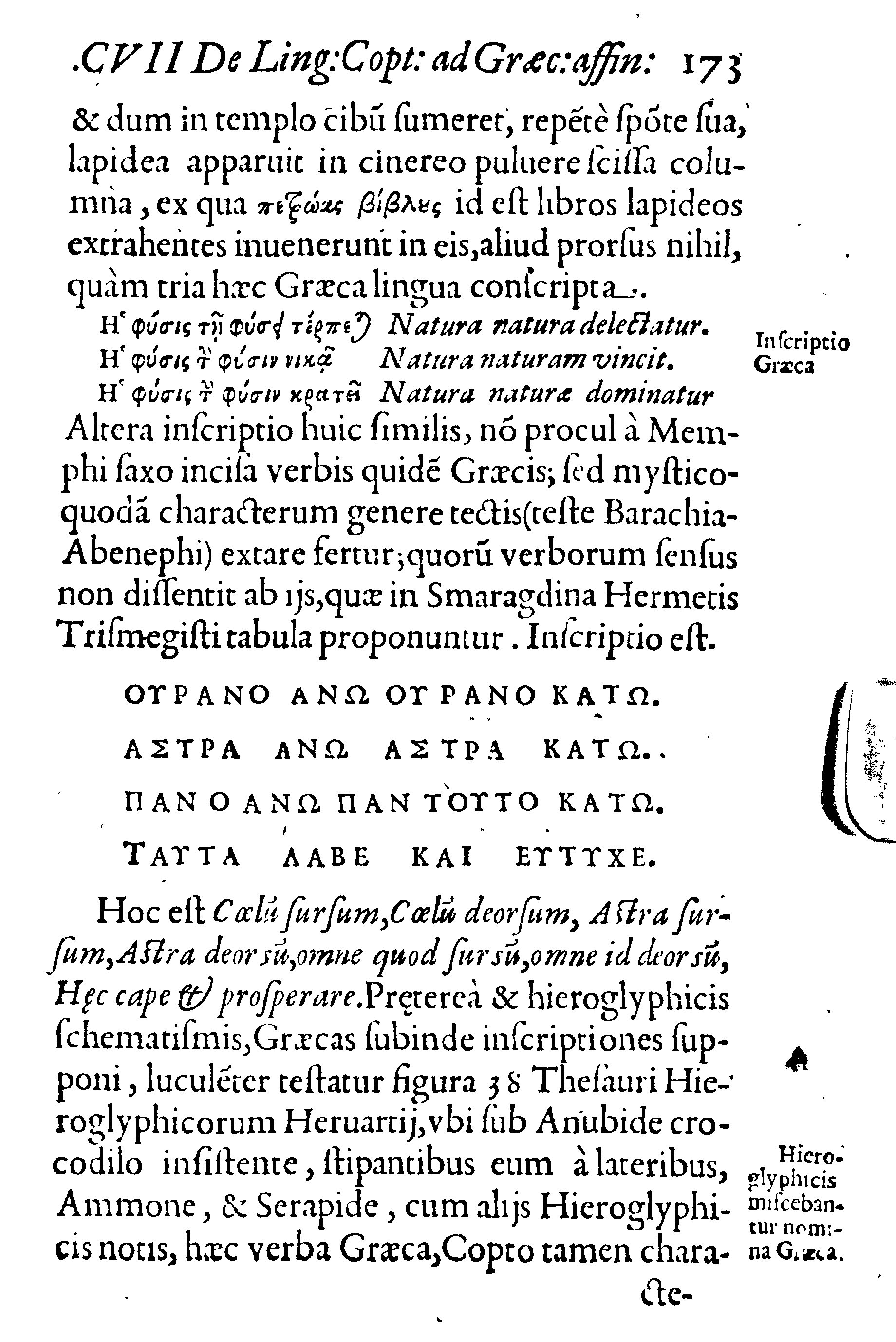
Tabula memphitica from Prodromus Coptus

Scholars in the Catholic Church were interested in the languages of the ancient Near East because they wanted to demonstrate that the Church represented a continuation of the beliefs and practices of the early Christian community. Likewise, the discovery of Church of the East texts in China suggested that Christianity was not a recent introduction there and that there was a connection between the ancient civilisations of the world. Two printed versions of Prodromus are known to exist; on one the title page (illustrated) carried the emblem of its patron Cardinal Barberini, while the other replaced the crest with an image of Jesus speaking to his disciples with the motto from the Gospel of St. Mark: "Go through the whole world and preach the Gospel to all mankind."

Kircher, along with other scholars of his age, was actively looking for links to connect China with the civilisations of the ancient world. In Prodromus he theorised that there had been ancient "Egyptian or Coptic expeditions into India, China and other parts of Asia", and Coptic colonies in Africa and Asia. He was particularly interested in the Xi'an Stele, which had both Chinese and Syriac inscriptions and was evidence of an early historic Christian presence in China.

Kircher believed that Coptic was a vestige of the ancient Egyptian language, recorded in hieroglyphs, that he had first encountered during his tertianship. He was shown several Coptic manuscripts by Nicolas Claude Fabri de Peiresc in Avignon and later also obtained an Arabic-Coptic vocabulary brought from Egypt by Pietro della Valle.

The Vatican Library already owned an extensive collection of Coptic manuscripts, but hardly anyone could read them. In Rome Kircher had acquired an Arabic manuscript with a basic grammar, which he translated into Latin in one of the sections of the Prodromus.

== Argument ==
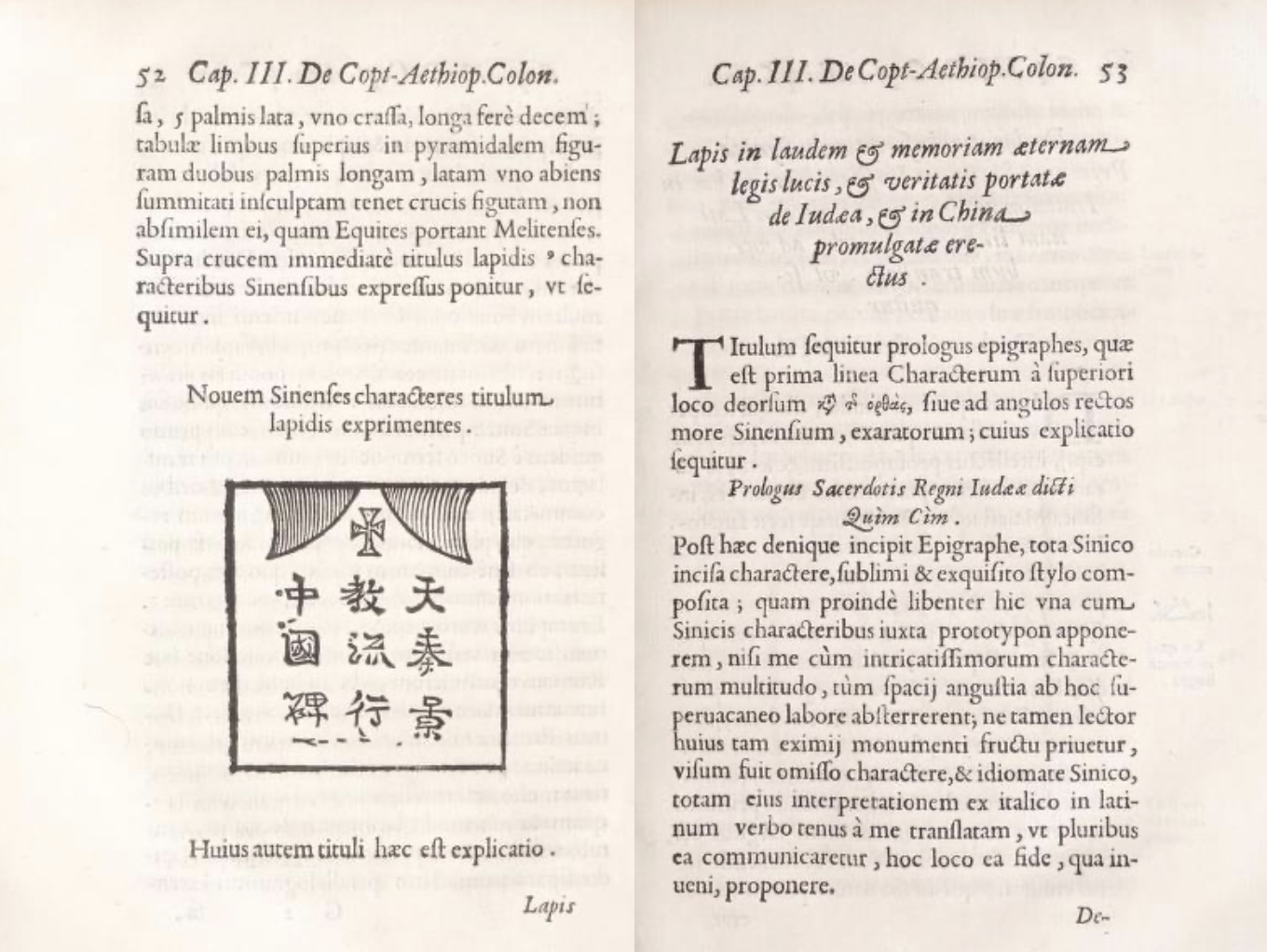
Pages from Prodromus Coptus showing Chinese script

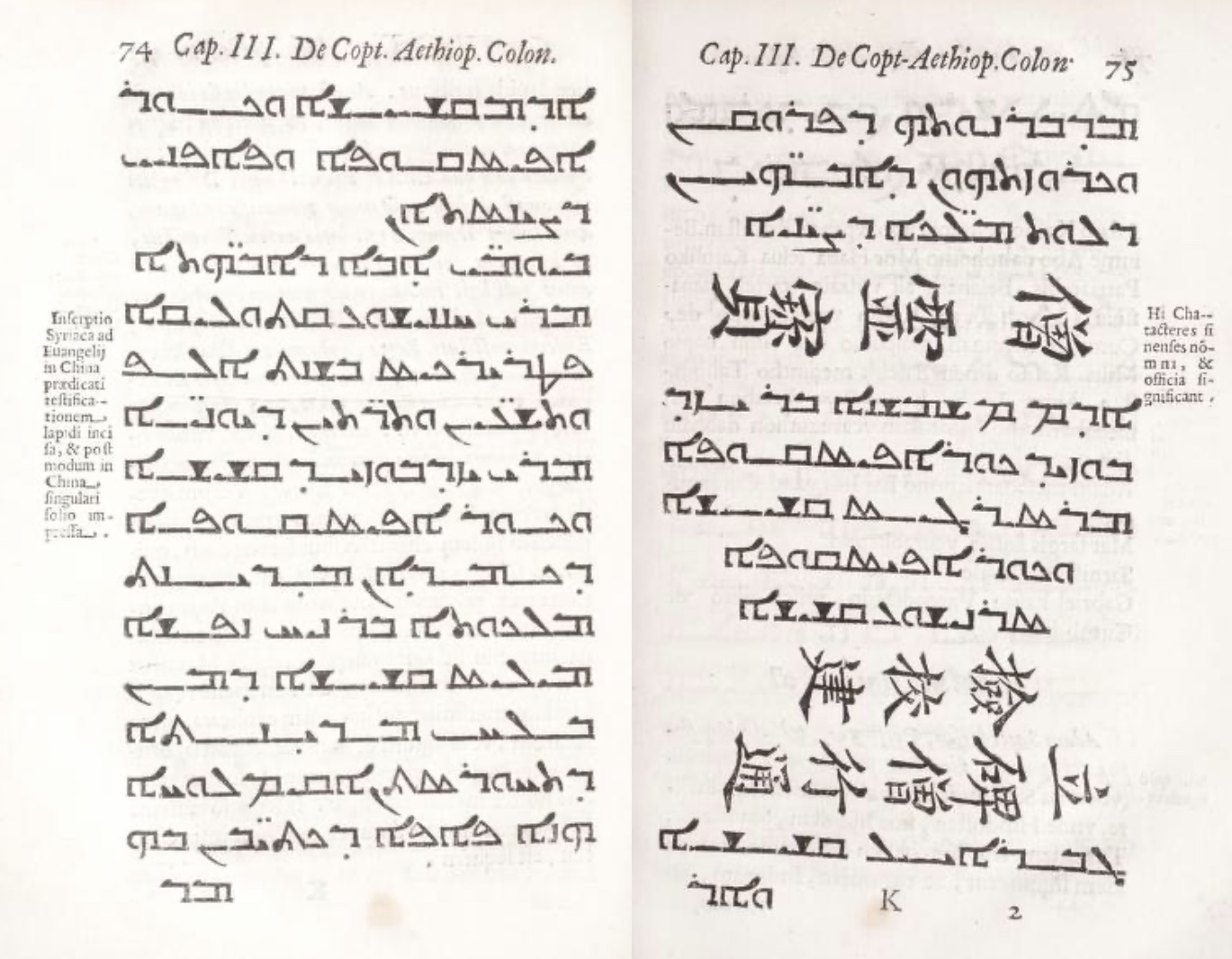
Pages from Prodromus Coptus showing Chinese and Syriac scripts

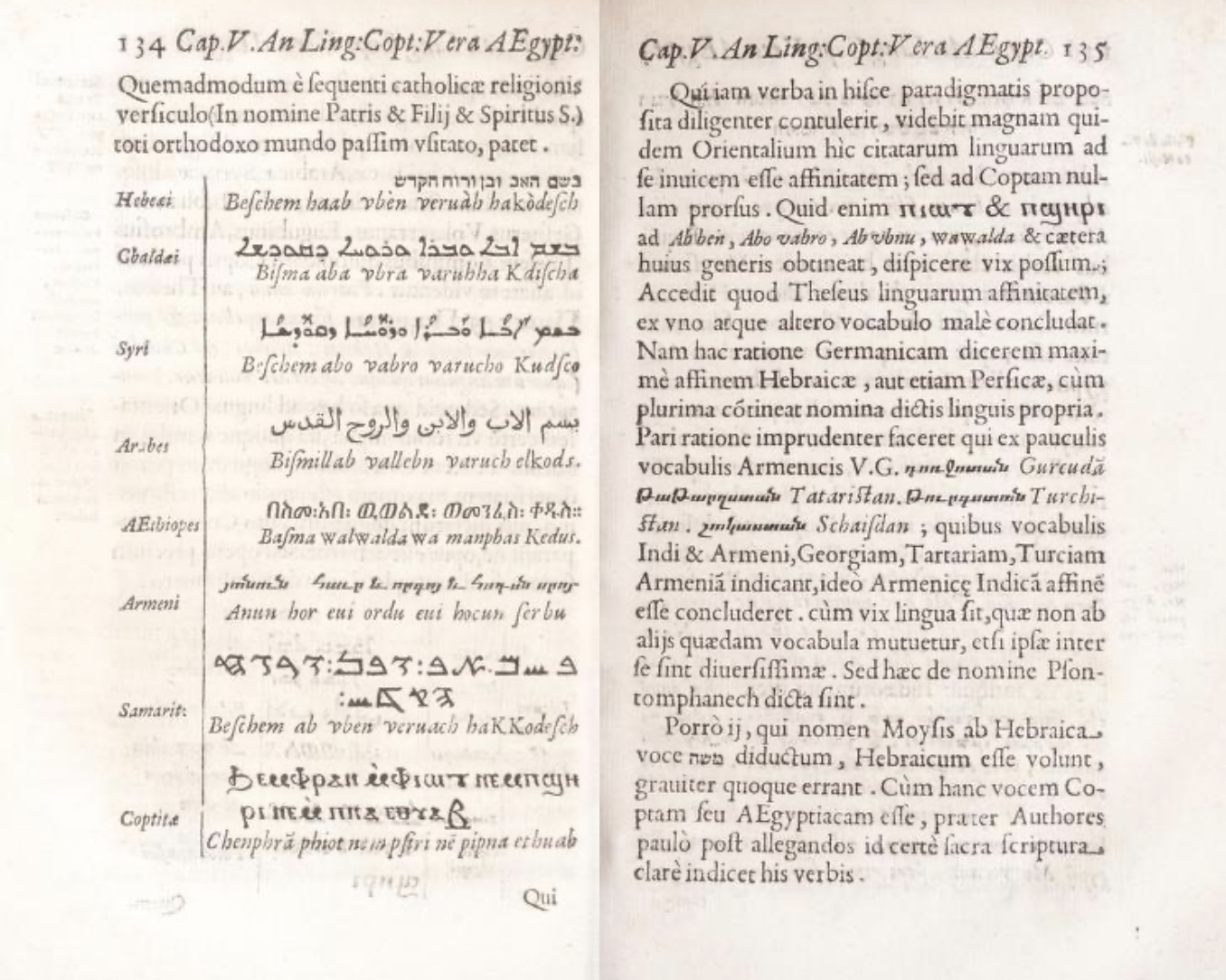
Pages from Prodromus Coptus showing comparison of different scripts

Prodromus sought to connect Coptic with many different languages—Arabic, Classical Armenian, Geʽez, Samaritan Hebrew, and Syriac. While this was a challenge both to conceive and to print, the frequent mistakes in Kircher's Arabic suggest that many of the connections he claimed to find were of questionable reliability. With Coptic texts, he did not translate them, but merely placed them side by side—often inaccurately—with their equivalent passages from the Vulgate.

The book opened with a series of endorsements from religious leaders of the various communities using the languages described by Kircher: the archbishop of Tripoli (Syriac), a Maronite scholar working in Rome (Arabic, Samaritan), an Armenian priest, four Ethiopian priests, a priest who spoke Chaldaic and various European scholars of Hebrew.

The book then discussed the relationships between several ancient Near Eastern languages—Kircher mistakenly believed that Coptic was related to Greek. It then went on to discuss the Syriac inscriptions on the Xi'an Stele, although Kircher could not read Chinese. There was then a long and entirely speculative section on the meaning of hieroglyphs. As an appendix, there was a grammar of the Coptic language and finally an advertisement for Kircher's promised major work on these matters, Oedipus Aegyptiacus, including an outline of the sections of the proposed book.

Kircher returned to this field of study in his later works Lingua Aegyptiaca Restituta (1643), Obeliscus Pamphilius (1659) and Oedipus Aegyptiacus (1652-4).

== Printing ==
The presses of the Propaganda Fide already had typesets for Greek, Arabic, Hebrew, and Ethiopian at the time Prodromus was published, but there was no typeset for Chinese characters. A new typeset for the Coptic alphabet had to be created specially in order to print the work, which has been described as "a tour de force of seventeenth-century typography."

== Critical reception ==
Prodromus achieved immediate popularity and established Kircher's reputation as a scholar. The first enthusiastic response to the work came from Kircher's fellow Jesuit, Melchior Inchofer, who had been appointed as its censor. Normally censors wrote succinct reports with an opinion as to whether a work posed any doctrinal problems, but Inchofer was expansive in his praise, hailing the book as "a worthy beginning from which we may anticipate what will follow." A more critical note was sounded by Kircher's former mentor Peiresc, who complained of his inaccurate transliterations and warned him that presenting theories and conjectures as established fact would damage his reputation.

The book had a wide circulation and appears to have had at least two printings. Cardinal Barberini took 220 copies from the first printing and 500 were circulated in Spain, Portugal, Germany and Poland.

Jean-François Champollion, a later Coptic scholar who deciphered the Rosetta Stone, said that "L'Europe savante doit en quelque sorte a Kircher la connaissance de la langue copte; et il merite, sous ce rapport, d'autant plus d'indulgence pour ses erreurs nombreuses, que les monuments litteraires des Coptes etaient plus rares de son temps". (European scholarship more or less owes its understanding of the Coptic language to Kircher and in this regard he merits all the greater forgiveness of his mistakes given that Coptic literary materials were rarer during his period.)
