= Ibn Kabar =

Ibn Kabar (Shams al-Riʾāsa Abū al-Barakāt ibn Kabar, d. 1324) was a Coptic Christian author of an ecclesiastical encyclopedia known as Mișbâḥ al-ẓulma.

He was secretary to the Mamluk minister Baybars al-Manșûrî, presumably editing the latter's work Zubdat al-fikra fi ta'rîkh al-hijra ("quintessence of thought in Muslim history"). He was ordained as a priest in 1300, under the name of Barsum and took office in Mu'allaqah, the ancient Coptic church in Cairo. A number of rhyming Arabic sermons of his have been preserved. He had to flee the persecution of Christians in 1321, and died shortly after.

His main works are:

- Al-Sullam al-kabir "the great ladder", a Bohairic-Arabic lexicon. This work was widely received and survives in numerous copies. It was first edited in 1643 in Rome with a Latin translation by Athanasius Kircher (Lingua Aegyptiaca Restituta).
- Mișbâḥ al-ẓulma wa-îḍâḥ al-khidma ("the lamp of shadows and the illumination of service"), an ecclesiastical encyclopedia in 24 chapters and divided in two large parts. The first part, chapters 1 to 6, is dedicated to dogmatic and canonical matters (theology, hagiography, canon law, biblical exegesis) and the second part (chapters 8 to 24) deals with the office of the various categories of priests from a liturgical and practical viewpoint. Interposed between the two parts is chapter 7, a very valuable catalogue of books by Christian authors of different denominations that were available in Arabic (partly via translation from Greek, Syriac or Coptic) at the time.
