= Lingua Aegyptiaca Restituta =

1643 work by Athanasius Kircher

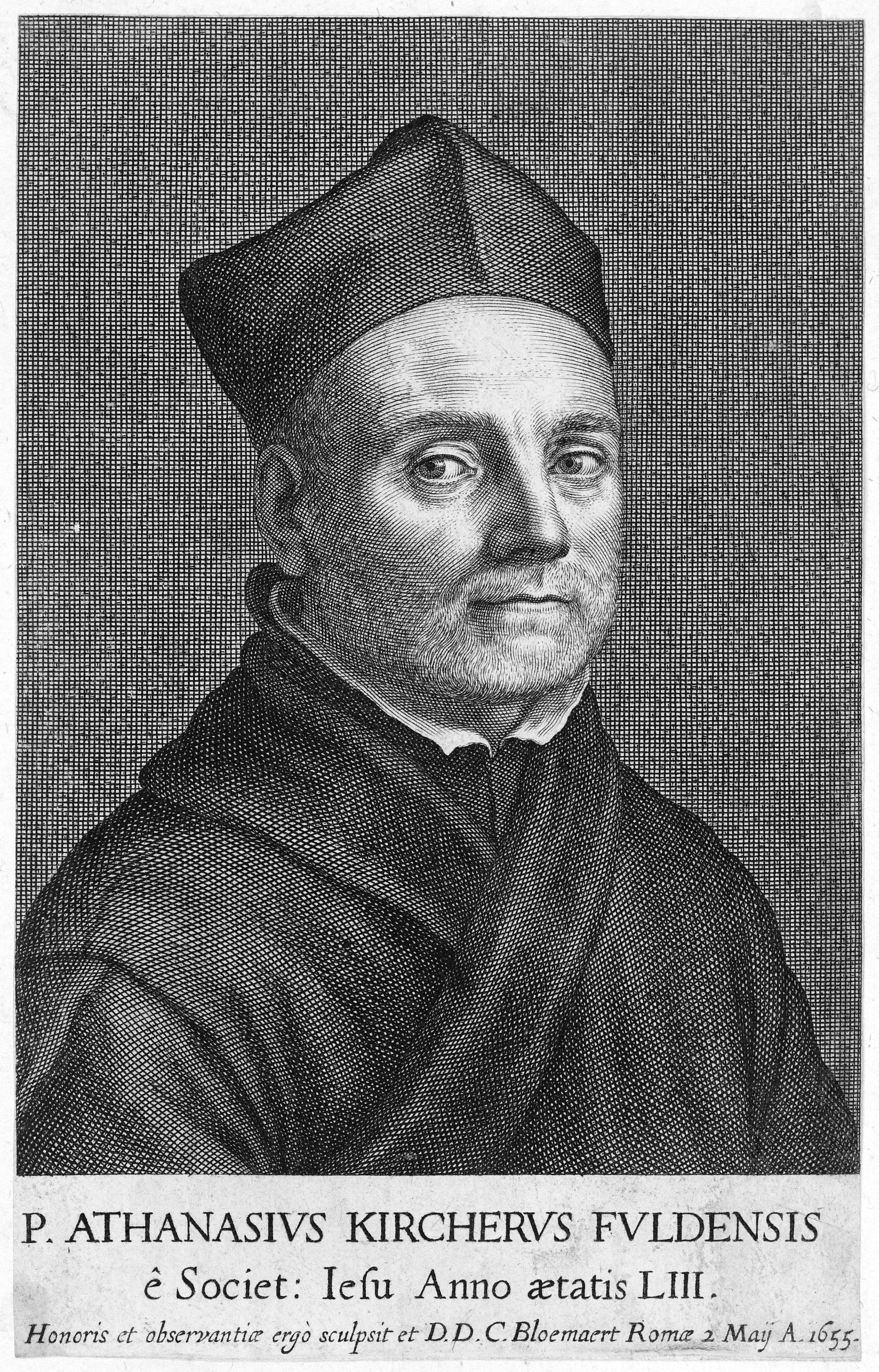
Athanasius Kircher

Lingua Aegyptiaca Restituta (Egyptian Language Restored) was a 1643 work about the Coptic language by the Jesuit scholar Athanasius Kircher. It followed his 1636 volume Prodromus Coptus sive Aegyptiacus (The Coptic or Egyptian Forerunner), the first ever published grammar of Coptic. Lingua Aegyptiaca Restituta was dedicated to the Holy Roman Emperor Ferdinand III and published in Rome by Herman Scheuss.

== Development and reception ==
The basis of the work was manuscripts containing an Arabic-Coptic vocabulary that he had obtained from Pietro della Valle. Della Valle had originally given these manuscripts to a Franciscan named Tomasso Obicini to edit and publish. When Obicini died, Della Valle passed the material on to Kircher, who did not give either of them credit in his acknowledgements, but the work was in fact a translation of the glossaries contained in those manuscripts. At the same time, Kircher used the new book as an opportunity to include extensive revisions to the Prodromus Coptus—various scholars had pointed out mistakes in his earlier work. Lingua Aegyptiaca Restituta, on the other hand, was regarded as an authoritative piece of scholarship for many years—as late as 1775 parts of it were incorporated into Scholtz and Woide's Lexicon Aegyptiaco-Latinum.

== Notable content ==
Lingua Aegyptiaca Restituta contained the notation for a Coptic hymn that Kircher claimed to have written down from "the mouth of my Coptic scribe", whose identity is unknown. The hymn is however not found anywhere in the contemporary Coptic liturgy, and has been described by some scholars as sounding like "a Western Church hymn." These considerations aside, the work remains the earliest-known Western transcription of Coptic music.

The work also contained tables of the Coptic and Arabic names of signs of the zodiac and the 28 sets of equinoctial-ecliptic stars. It is not clear however whether the Arabic names derived from the earlier Coptic forms, or whether the Coptic terms were themselves borrowed from the Arabic. Kircher asserted that the Ancient Egyptian names, preserved in Coptic, formed the basis of Babylonian and Indian names for the same equinoctial-ecliptic stars.

== Relationship with other works ==
The preface also announced that, having concluded his studies of Coptic, he intended to publish a comprehensive work on the language of ancient Egypt, his Oedipus Aegyptiacus. In fact however before he embarked on this major work, he produced a smaller volume of Egyptological analysis, his Obeliscus Pamphilius (1650).

== See also ==
- Ibn Kabar

== Bibliography ==
- Fletcher, J. (2011). "2. The Hieroglyph Enigma". In 2. The Hieroglyph Enigma. Leiden, The Netherlands: Brill. doi: https://doi.org/10.1163/9789004216327_003
