= A Man of Misconceptions =

Biography of Athanasius Kircher by John Glassie

- First edition cover
- Author: John Glassie
- Published: Riverhead Books
- Publication date: 2012
- ISBN: 978-1594488719

A Man of Misconceptions: The Life of an Eccentric in an Age of Change is a biography written by John Glassie about Athanasius Kircher, a 17th-century German Jesuit scholar, scientist, author, and inventor. Published by Riverhead Books in 2012, it is regarded by The New York Times as the first general-interest biography of Kircher, who has experienced a resurgence of academic attention in recent decades.

The book traces Kircher's life from his birth in 1602 in Germany through his rise as a scholar at the Jesuit Collegio Romano to the decline of his reputation and his death in Rome in 1680. After Kircher arrived in Rome in 1633, a few months after the Galileo trial, he pursued myriad interests, authoring more than thirty books on such subjects as optics, magnetism, music, medicine, and mathematics, and developing a collection of natural specimens and curiosities into a well known Cabinet of Curiosities or early modern museum. He also worked with Gianlorenzo Bernini on his Fountain of the Four Rivers in the Piazza Navona and labored for many years on the decipherment of Egyptian hieroglyphs. The book places Kircher's work and his interest in natural magic and mysticism within the context of the Scientific Revolution. Glassie draws connections between Kircher and 17th-century figures such as René Descartes, Gottfried Leibniz, and Isaac Newton. He also illustrates later influences on Edgar Allan Poe, Jules Verne, Madame Blavatsky, and Marcel Duchamp.

Reviews have appeared in The New York Times, The New York Times Book Review, The New Yorker, The Wall Street Journal, The Nation, The Daily Beast and a number of other media outlets. Glassie has appeared on the NPR shows All Things Considered and Science Friday as well as on C-SPAN2's BookTV to discuss the biography. A Man of Misconceptions was selected as a New York Times Book Review "Editor's Choice." It was named one of the best science books of 2012 by Jennifer Ouellette, a writer for Scientific American, and included in an Atlantic Wire article "The Books We Loved in 2012."
