= Phonurgia Nova =

1673 book by Athanasius Kircher

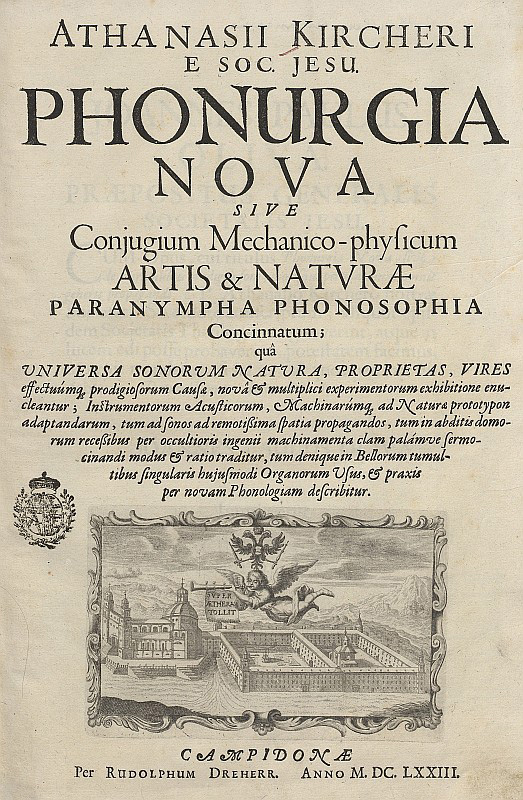
title page of Phonurgia Nova

Phonurgia Nova ("New Science of Sound Production") is a 1673 work by the Jesuit scholar Athanasius Kircher. It is notable for being the first book ever dedicated entirely to the science of acoustics, and for containing the earliest description of an aeolian harp. It was dedicated to the Holy Roman Emperor Leopold I and printed in Kempten by Rudoph Dreherr.

== Purpose and argument ==
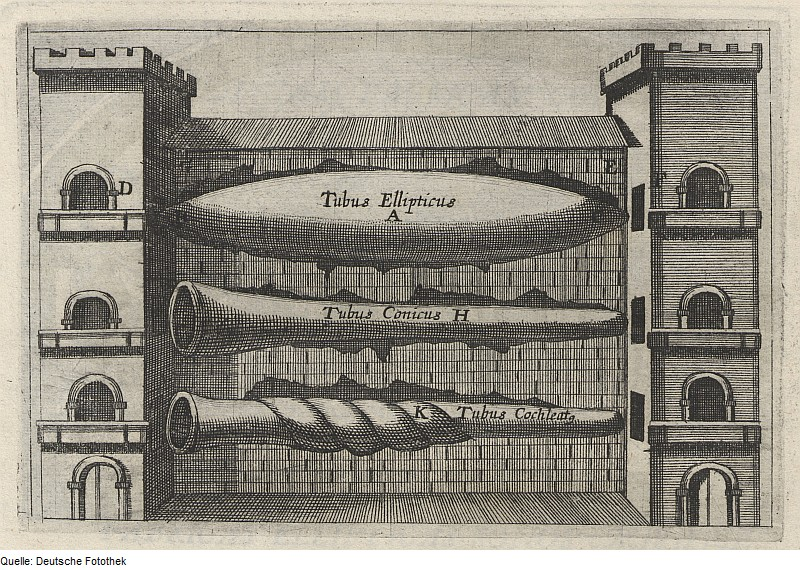
Illustration of different designs of acoustic tube, from Phonurgia Nova

Kircher was prompted to write the work because Samuel Morland had published a claim to have invented the speaking trumpet. Kircher wished to defend his own priority in this invention, asserting that he had used a "tuba stentorophonica" for many years at the shrine of Saint Eustace at the it:Santuario della Mentorella to broadcast calls for the faithful to come to mass. As evidence he referred to his own work Musurgia Universalis, published in 1650.

The work is divided in two books. The first, the Phonosophia anacamptica offered a detailed examination of the phenomenon of the echo. He expounded his theory that sound moved in sound waves, bouncing off surfaces like light off a mirror; indeed the first chapter opens with the maxim “Sonus lucis simia est” (“sound is like light”). He also described the use of various designs of tube to pick up and amplify sound. As he developed his argument, Kircher described various devices of his own invention including speaking statues, musical instruments with internal mechanisms that generated unexpected harmonies, and the aeolian harp. The second book, Phonosophia nova discussed the influence of music on the human mind, and the therapeutic use of music. Among other things he looked in detail at tarantism.

== Illustrations ==
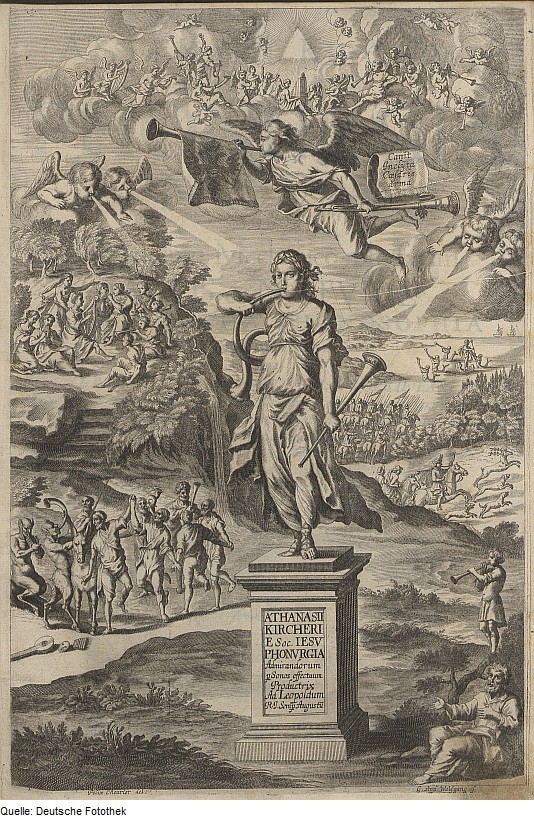
Frontispiece of Phonurgia Nova

The frontispiece of the work depicts, at the top, a choir and orchestra of angels gathered around a pyramid representing the Holy Trinity. Beneath them an allegorical figure of Fame flies across the heavens blowing her trumpet and carrying a banner proclaiming "Canit inclyta caeseris arma" ("She proclaims the Emperor's illustrious arms"). On the left sits Apollo surrounded by the nine Muses on Mount Parnassus and below them Pan leads a group celebrating a bacchanalia. On the right a group of tritons escort Poseidon across the sea, kettledrums and trumpets accompany a cavalry charge, and a huntsman blows his horn while chasing deer. In the centre the figure standing appears to be Fame once again, standing on a pedestal blowing a horn. She also holds a trumpet, into which putti are blowing from above, while beneath them a man speaks into a tube while facing the surface of the pedestal. An echo, denoted by a dotted line, carries the sound from the pedestal to the ear of a man reclining at the bottom of the illustration.

The original artwork for the portrait of Emperor Leopold I was by Franz Georg Hermann and the frontispiece was by Felix Cheurier. The engravings for both were undertaken by Georg Andreas Wolfgang the Elder.
