= Ars Magnesia =

1631 book by Athanasius Kircher

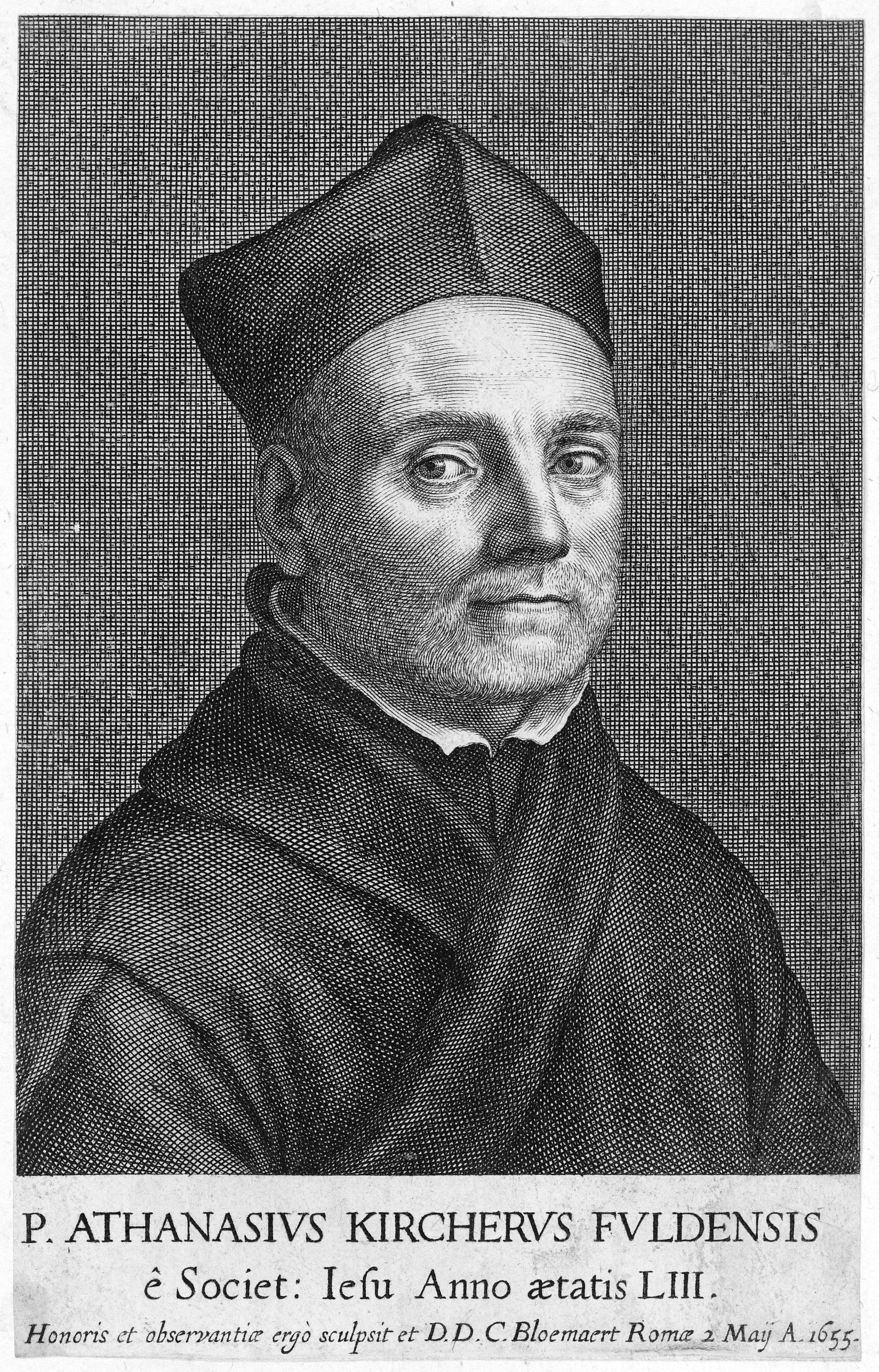
Athanasius Kircher

Ars Magnesia (The Magnetic Art) was a book on magnetism by the Jesuit scholar Athanasius Kircher in 1631. It was his first published work, written while he was professor of ethics and mathematics, Hebrew and Syriac at the University of Würzburg. It was published in Würzburg by Elias Michael Zink.

== Ideas discussed ==
The work is a 48-page pamphlet that appears to be a printed version of a lecture he had given some years previously while teaching at the Jesuit seminary in Heiligenstadt. It is a mixture of descriptions of Kircher’s own experiments and accounts drawn from classical authorities. He describes his own attempts to measure the force of a magnet by using a balance, relates how an eruption of Vesuvius caused magnetic needles to change direction, and wonders that a red-hot piece of iron is attracted by a magnet, although the magnet is not attracted by it. He also suggested that magnetism could serve as a basis for long-distance communication. He cited the works of Pliny and Plutarch and suggested conserving a magnet’s strength by wrapping it in dried woad leaves. He warned that leaving a magnet near a diamond or rubbing it with garlic would weaken it, but its strength could be regained by pouring boar’s blood over it.

Ars Magnesia also discussed how the powers of magnetism could be used to illustrate the miracles of the Bible. Years later in Rome, Kircher built machinery to demonstrate his propositions, allowing him to stage Jonah being swallowed by a whale by means of magnetism. He also constructed a glass sphere half-filled with water, containing a model of St. Peter with a magnet inside it, and another of Jesus with steel inside it, which could re-enact Jesus saving Peter as he walked on water.

To conclude, Kircher explained how the power of the magnet symbolized the divine authority of the Holy Trinity, the secular authority of an emperor, king, and prince, and the spiritual authority of priest, bishop, and preacher.

== Later works on magnetism ==
Robert Boyle later wrote of magnetism that “the ingenious Kircher hath so largely prosecuted it in his voluminous Ars Magnetica (sic), yet he has not reaped his field so clean, but that a careful gleaner, may still find ears enough to make some sheaves.” Kircher returned to the subject of magnetism several times in his later studies, publishing Magnes sive de Arte Magnetica (1641) and Magneticum Naturae regnum (1667).
