= Arithmologia =

1665 work by Athanasius Kircher

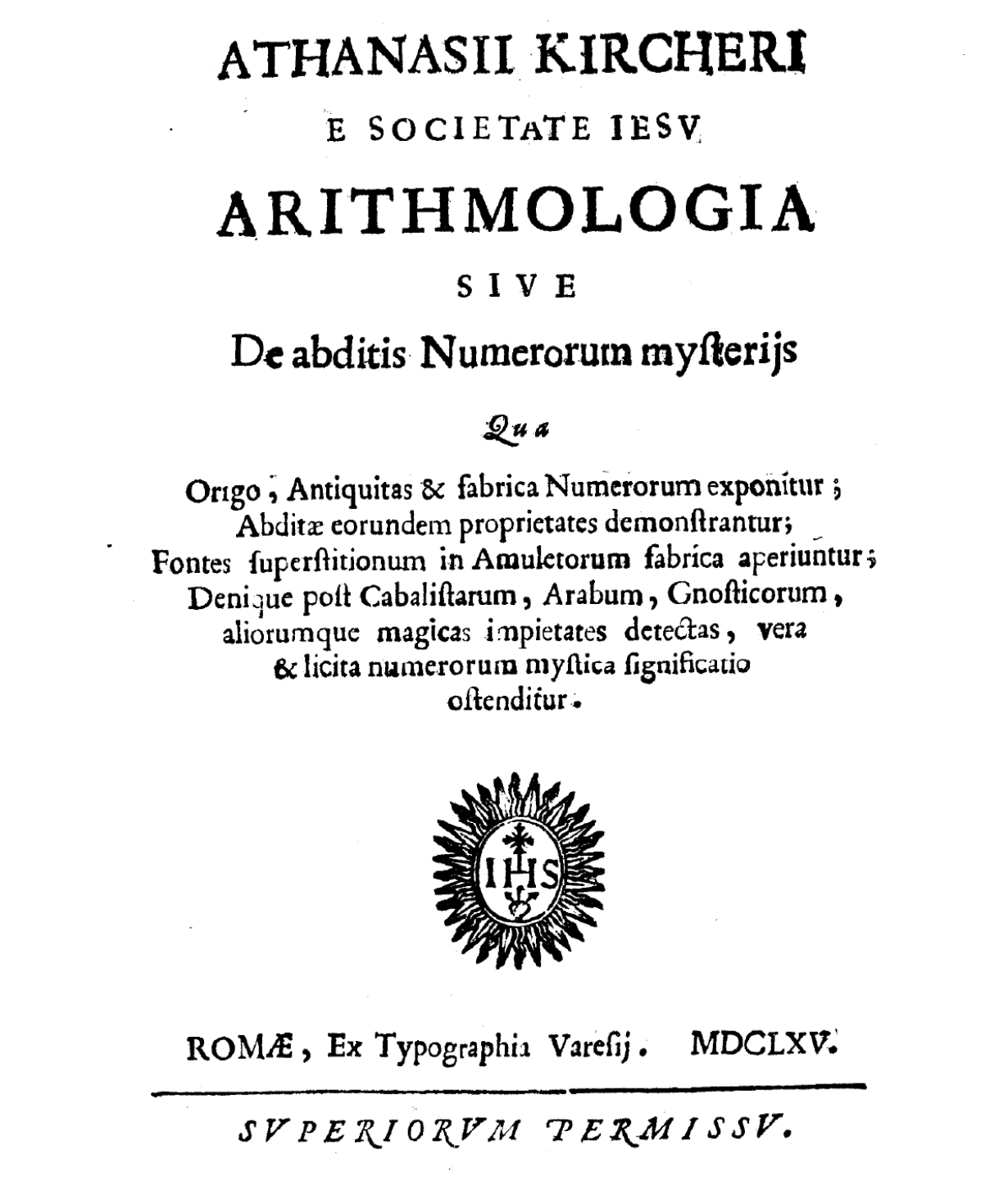
Title page of Arithmologia sive De abditis numerorum mysterijs

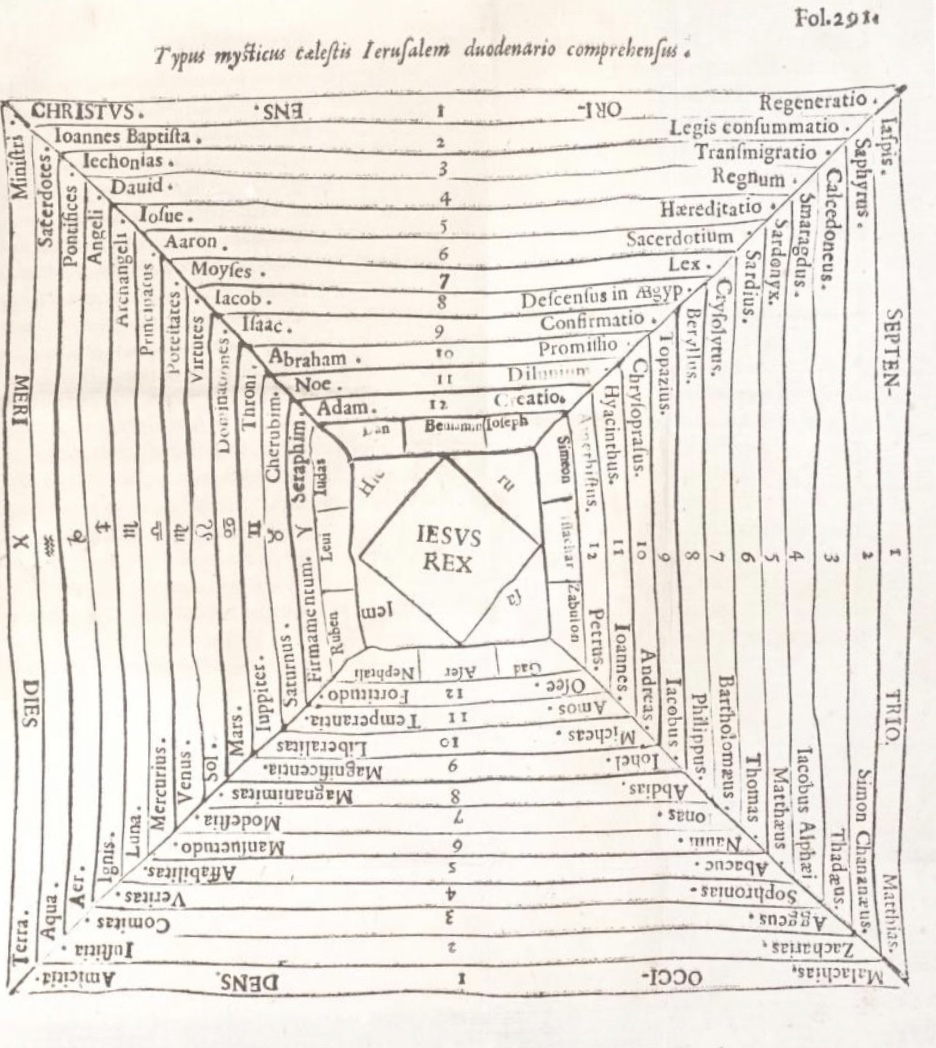
Illustration from Kircher’s “Arithmologia”

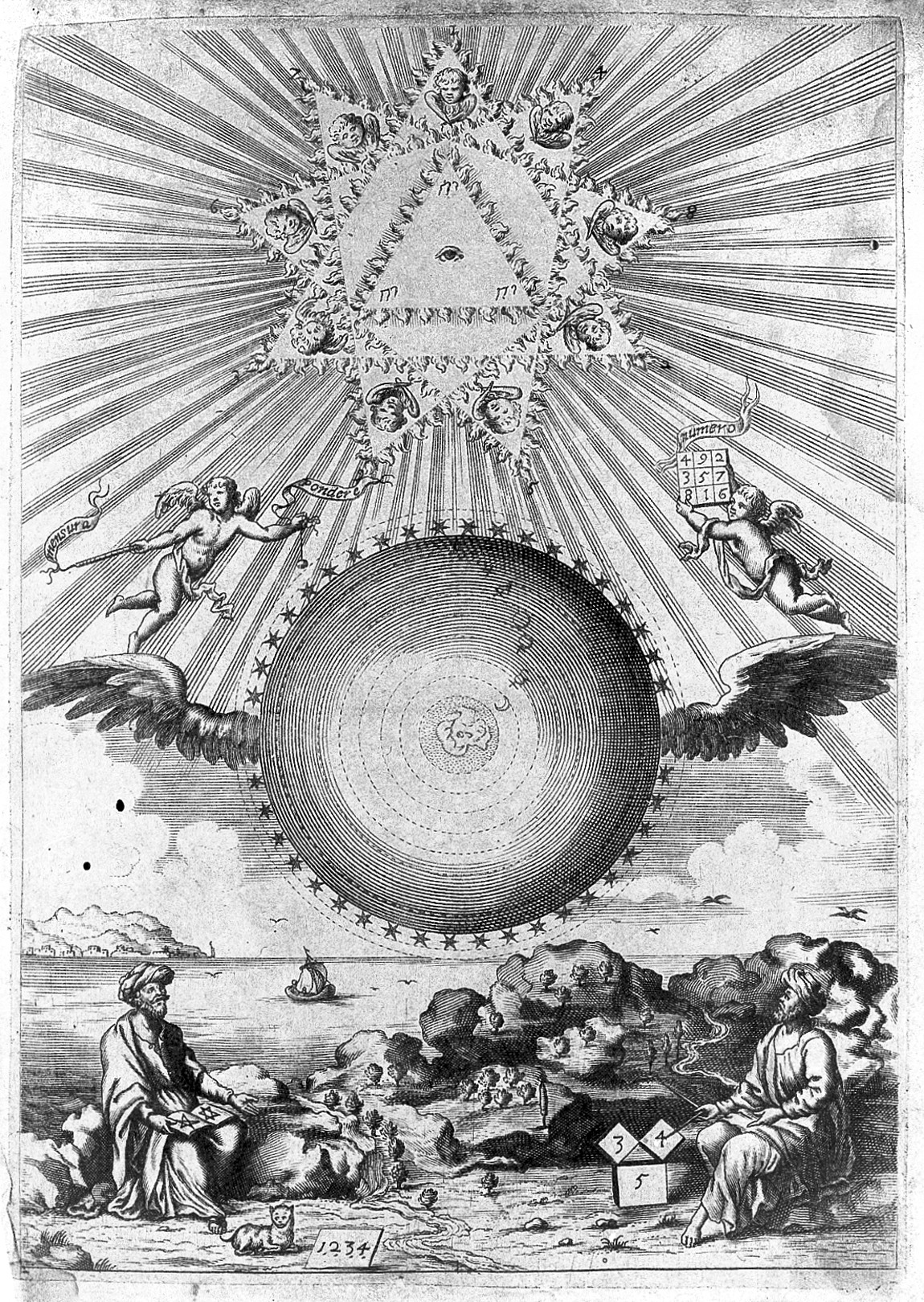
Frontispiece of Arithmologia

Arithmologia, sive De Abditis Numerorum Mysteriis is a 1665 work by the Jesuit scholar Athanasius Kircher. It was published by Varese, the main printing house for the Jesuit order in Rome in the mid-17th century. It was dedicated to Franz III. Nádasdy, a convert to Catholicism to whom Kircher had previously co-dedicated Oedipus Aegyptiacus. Arithmologia is the only one of Kircher's works devoted entirely to different aspects of number symbolism.

== Content ==
Arithmologia was concerned with exploring numbers as the underlying principle and structure of the universe, and as the key to mystic understanding previously revealed to patriarchs and philosophers in ancient times. The field of arithmology may be understood as the intersection of traditional religious numerology and contemporary mathematics, drawing on ideas from Pythagoras, Gnosticism, and the Kabbala. The work discussed the significance of numbers in astrology, divination, magic formulas, amulets, seals and symbolic matrices. Kircher's purpose, as he declared in the final chapter, was to articulate a Christian philosophy of number, revealing the hidden harmonies within the material world and its connections with the spiritual.

== Illustrations ==
The frontispiece depicts, at the top, the all-seeing Eye of Providence within a triangle representing the Holy Trinity. In each angle Hebrew letters spell out Jah, the name of God. Around this the nine orders of angels are arranged in three more overlapping triangles. Beneath this fly two putti, one carrying a ruler and a plumb line, while the other carries a tablet with the magic square of three. Within this square, numbers can be added by row, by column or diagonally, but always add up to fifteen. This figure can be compared similarly to that of the enneagram.

In the centre of the image is a winged representation of the cosmos; the winged sphere was an ancient Egyptian symbol that Kircher interpreted as meaning the anima mundi. On the outer rim of this sphere are the primum mobile and the fixed stars, and within them the planets orbiting around the static earth at the centre. Beneath this, in the realm of the physical world, sit a learned Jew with an open book displaying the stars of David and Solomon, and a classical philosopher pointing to a model of Pythagoras' theorem.
