= Specula Melitensis Encyclica =

1638 book by Fra Salvatore Imbroll

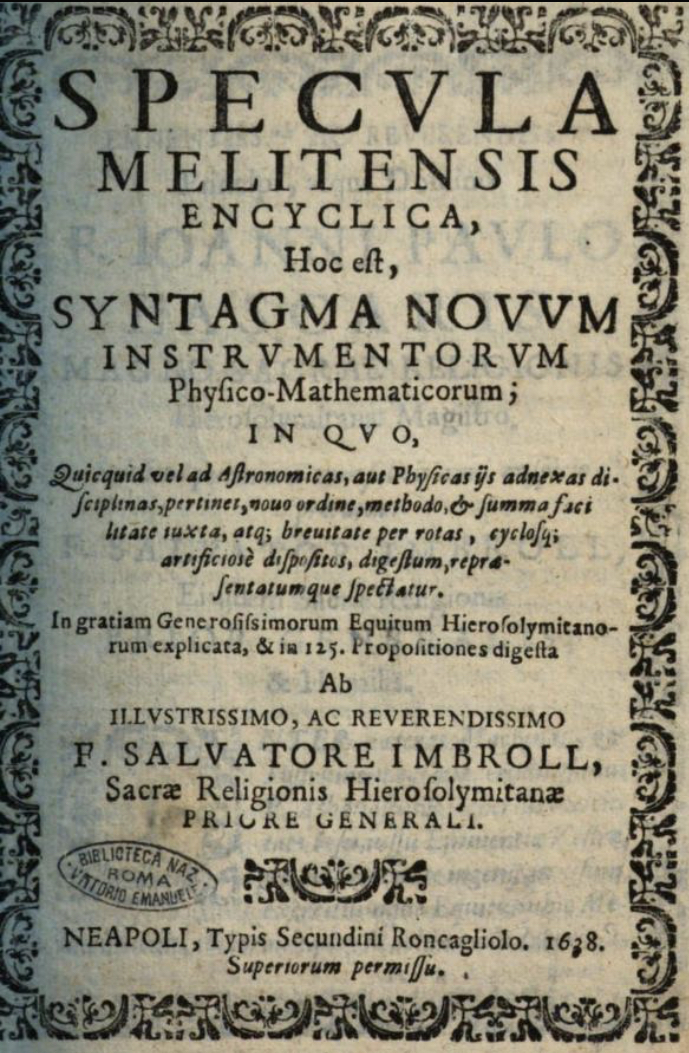
Title page of “Specula Melitensis Encyclica”

Specula Melitensis Encyclica (“The Maltese Watchtower”) is a 1638 book by Fra Salvatore Imbroll, describing a machine invented by a Jesuit scholar Athanasius Kircher. It was printed in Naples by Secundino Roncagliolo and dedicated to Giovanni Paolo Lascaris, Grand Master of the Knights of Malta.

The book describes a machine that Kircher had devised while on a trip to Malta as the confessor of Friedrich of Hesse-Darmstadt. The machine was a combination mechanical calculator and a reference of contemporary scientific knowledge related primarily to astronomy, astrology, and medicine. The author of the document, Fra Salvatore Imbroll, seemed to have completed the project begun by Kircher.

Kircher's work in 1638 predates that of Blaise Pascal, but comes after the mechanical calculators devised by John Napier and Wilhelm Schickard.

== Title ==
The full title reads

Specula Melitensis Encyclica, that is, a Syntagma of new Physico-Mathematical Instruments, in which anything pertaining to either Astronomy, or Physics, or disciplines related to them, by a new order and method, with utmost facility and brevity via wheels and dials artfully disposed, is seen orderly arranged.

The Latin word specula means a watchtower. The similarity of the words specula and speculum ("mirror") has led to the common mistranslation of the title as The Maltese Mirror or a variation of that. The intended meaning is explained in the first paragraph of the book:

This machine of ours is called Specula Melitensis both because of the similarity of its shape and form to that of a watchtower, and because, as from any watchtower, all in the circumference of the Horizon, being exposed far and wide, is revealed to an encounter, likewise as from this Specula, quicker than word, anything pertaining to Astronomy, Geography, Hydrography, Physics, and Medicine is revealed to the eye.

== Book content ==
The book opens with a dedication to Johannes (Giovanni) Paulus Lascaris, and a credit to the machine's creator, "the most erudite" Athanasius Kircher. It lauds the machine as the greatest of all the machines and instruments Kircher had invented. The introduction is dated January 6, 1638.

The work proper begins with a five-page Synopsis of That, Which in this Machine, or Syntagma, is Contained. The Synopsis gives a description of the machine's overall appearance and organization, its primary parts of interest being the Cube and the Pyramid.

The synopsis is followed by the Usage section, which makes up the bulk of the work. The section consists of 125 Propositions organized in six sections, one for each side of the Cube and one for the Pyramid. Each Proposition explains a specific use of the machine.

== Description of the machine ==
The book does not include any illustrations or schematics. The machine is described as consisting of three principal parts: the Circle, the Cube, and the Pyramid.

The Circle forms the base, and features a representation of the immobile Horizon, and the information on the winds and the art of navigation.

The Cube is the middle part, with five of its sides (excluding the bottom) each dedicated to a specific Mathematical or "Physico-Logical" discipline as follows.

The first side, The Universal Chronoscope, contains eight wheels displaying Julian and Gregorian calendars.

The second side, The Cosmographical Mirror, includes a Horoscopium (not to be confused with a horoscope) which, given the current time in Malta, displays the time in any part of the world, and two planispheres showing the movement of the Primum Mobile and the eight spheres and the fixed stars, as well as the tides in all parts of the world.

The third side has in its middle a large wheel displaying the sunrise and sunset times, the sun's declination, star culminations, and other astronomical data by year, month, and day. The large wheel is surrounded by three additional wheels, and four more smaller wheels are arranged in the corners of that side of the Cube. The three wheels display Moon phases and astrological signs with their application to matters of agriculture, medicine and navigation, and physiognomical information. The four smaller wheels in the corners provide predictions based on planetary conjunctions.

The fourth side presents "the entire Medicine—Botanical, Chemical, Spagyrical, Hermetic, and Sympathetic". It features four wheels. The first wheel contains information on the "simple and compound" medications of both mineral and animal origin. The second and the third wheels offer guidance in disease diagnostics. The fourth wheel, titled The Cabalistic Mirror, indicates which body part accommodates which medicine, and suggests the appropriate times for phlebotomy and the application of medicines.

The fifth side, which is the horizontal upper side of the Cube, shows the movement of the Sun, Moon, the planets, lunar nodes Caput Draconis (☊) and Cauda Draconis (☋), and Zodiacal constellations, as well as their position at any given time.

The Pyramid consists of four parts corresponding to the four parts of the world, and describes the nature and languages of those parts.

== In fiction ==
Specula Melitensis features prominently in Umberto Eco's novel The Island of the Day Before. The description of the machine in the novel borrows liberally from Imbroll's book, however Kircher is not identified as the inventor. Instead, one of the characters, a Jesuit Father Caspar, finds a description of the machine in papers of his deceased brother, who in turn had learned about it from another brother who had traveled to Malta. The description is very brief and lacks any schematics or specifics, just like Imbroll's book. Father Caspar manages to construct a working machine from his understanding of the description.

Importantly for the plot, in the novel the third side of the Cube contains a Horologium Catholicum (not found in the original), which shows the local time at any Jesuit mission in the world. The Horologium makes it possible to determine the longitude of the current location.
