= Abacus (disambiguation) =

An abacus is a counting frame.

Abacus may also refer to:

== Companies and brands ==
- Abacus Federal Savings Bank, an overseas Chinese bank in the US
  - Abacus: Small Enough to Jail, 2016 documentary about the bank, which was the only financial institution to face criminal charges following the subprime mortgage crisis
- Abacus Data, a Canadian polling firm
- Abacus (imprint), an imprint of Little, Brown and Company
- Abacus Recordings, a defunct imprint of Century Media Records
- Abacus Jasper's Management Group, owned by chef Kent Rathbun

== Other uses ==
- Abacus (architecture), a flat slab forming the uppermost member or division of the capital of a column
- Abacus (journal), a peer-reviewed academic accounting journal
- Abacus school, a type of Renaissance-era Italian trade school
- Logical abacus, an early mechanical digital computer
- Mental abacus, a system involving visualization of an abacus to carry out arithmetical calculations
- Abacus Harmonicus, an ancient diagram showing the structure and placement of the keys of a particular musical instrument
- Operation Abacus, the Canadian military operation to restore vital services if the year 2000 caused disruption
