= Abacus Harmonicus =

Abacus Harmonicus, or Abacum Arithmetico-Harmonicum, is a table and tabular method described in Athanasius Kircher's comprehensive 1650 work on music, the Musurgia Vniversalis. The purpose is to generate counterpoint combinations. Also mentioned in early editions of the Encyclopædia Britannica, it is best described by the author's caption: "wonderful table that reveals all the secret art of counterpoint".
