= Itinerarium exstaticum =

1656 literary work by Athanasius Kircher

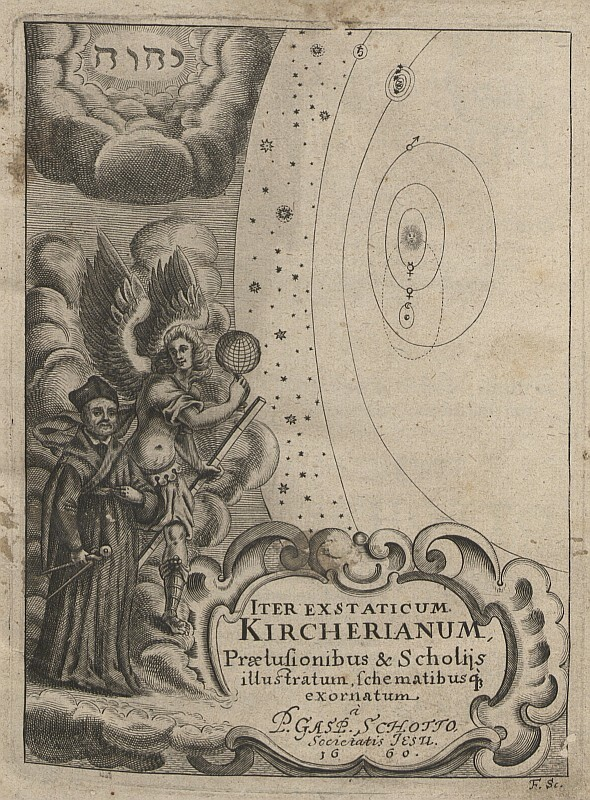
Frontispiece of Iter Exstaticum (1660)

Itinerarium exstaticum quo mundi opificium is a 1656 work by the Jesuit scholar Athanasius Kircher. It is an imaginary dialogue in which an angel named Cosmiel takes the narrator, Theodidactus ('taught by God'), on a journey through the planets. It is the only work by Kircher devoted entirely to astronomy, and one of only two pieces of imaginative fiction by him. A revised and expanded second edition, entitled Iter Exstaticum, was published in 1660.

The main theme of the work is space exploration through outer space. The novel's main character finds himself guided through the heavens by a guiding angel. Kircher depicts stars of different sizes, accompanied by planets, turning around each other and moving through space. The stars, as he described them were “fixed” but moved in circular orbits sometimes in systems of binary stars or multiple stars, with vast distances between them. As he believed they were very far away and all moved around the Earth (a geocentric model), Kircher believed that they moved with tremendous speed.

== Background ==
In his 1641 work Magnes sive de Arte Magnetica, Kircher had argued against the cosmological theories of both Kepler and Galileo, but had written nothing on the subject since. It is not clear why Kircher took it up again, though the preface mentions encouragement from Emperor Ferdinand III. The book was dedicated to Queen Christina of Sweden, who visited the Vatican just after it was published.

== Narrative ==
Itinerarium Exstaticum relates how, lulled into a sleepy reverie by a concert of sacred music in the Jesuit College, Theodidactus finds himself guided through the heavens by a guiding angel. The views Kircher explored in his dialogue were remarkable for a seventeenth-century Jesuit. He imagined stars of different sizes, accompanied by planets, turning around each other and moving through space. The stars, as he described them were "fixed" but moved in circular orbits sometimes in systems of binary or multiple stars, with vast distances between them. As he believed they were very far away and all moved around the Earth, he believed they moved with tremendous speed.

The only known translation of the work from Latin is an unpublished manuscript version Voyage extatique dans les globes célestes; dans les abimes de la mer et dans l'intérieur du globe terrestre. Traduit du Père Kirker composed in France between 1722 and 1736.

== Criticism ==
As was normal, Kircher's manuscript was reviewed by Jesuit censors before publication was approved by the Superior of the order. There were some misgivings that the work included views that were "dangerous to faith". When published, Itinerarium Exstaticum attracted considerable criticism for its departure from the Aristotelian cosmology that the Catholic Church had essentially adhered to since the trial of Galileo. In his work Kircher supported the Tychonic model of the universe, with the Earth at its centre and other planets moving around the Sun. However he also maintained, against Aristotle, that the different planets were all made of the same material as the Earth, and that sunspots existed.

== Iter Exstaticum ==
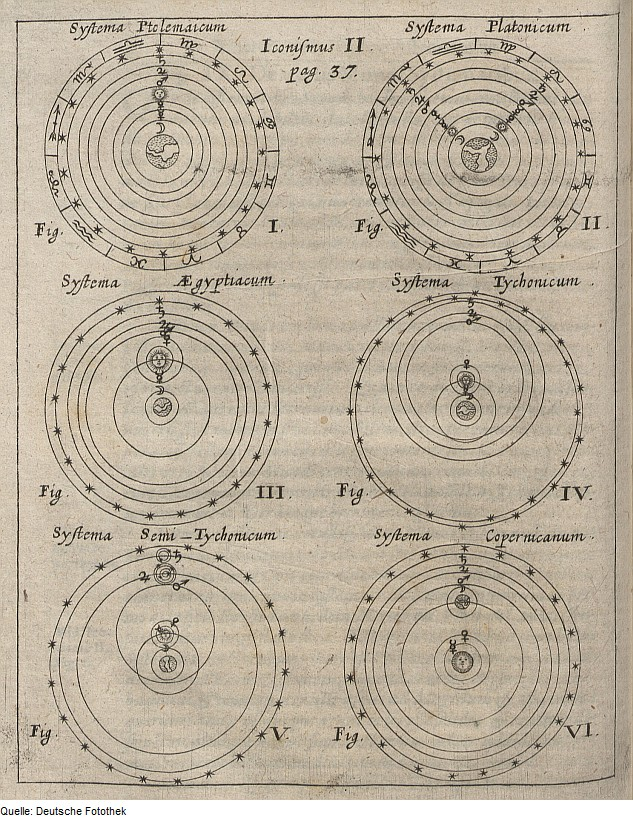
Diagram of different models of the universe, from Iter Exstaticum

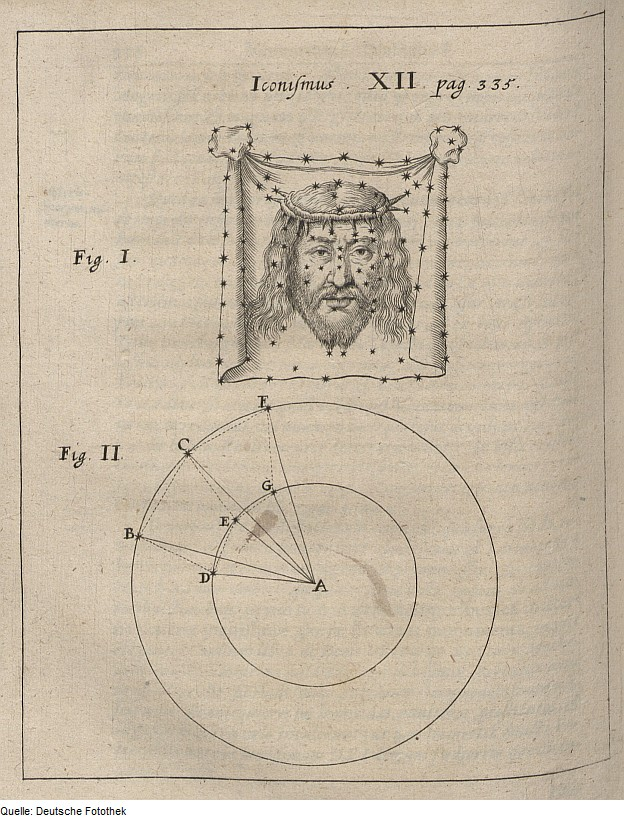
Illustration from Iter Exstaticum

Rather than reply to his critics himself, he had his student Kaspar Schott prepare a second edition which included additional details in refutation of his critics' arguments. This was published in Germany in 1660 under the title Iter Exstaticum.

A separate work with a similar title was Iter Exstaticum II (1657). Kircher advertised as a prelude to his Mundus Subterraneus; an extatic journey that took Theodidactus in the opposite direction, down under the earth. Itinerarium Exstaticum and Iter Exstaticum II were Kircher's only two ventures into imaginative fiction.

== Illustrations in Iter Exstaticum ==
As a work of imaginative literature, Itinerarium Exstaticum did not include illustrations. Iter Exstaticum (1660) however contained many explanatory diagrams. The frontispiece of Iter Exstaticum depicts Kircher himself holding a compass, with the angel Cosmiel next to him gesturing towards a huge image of the universe. This is a representation of the Tychonic system: while it is clearly marked as moving around the Earth, the Sun is represented at the centre of the universe, above all stands the name of God written in Hebrew. The frontispiece was the work of Johann Friedrich Fleischberger, a Nuremberg engraver. A copy of the 1660 revised edition is listed as once in the Library of Sir Thomas Browne.

== Bibliography ==
- Harald Siebert (2006). Die große kosmologische Kontroverse: Rekonstruktionsversuche anhand des Itinerarium exstaticum von Athanasius Kircher SJ (1602–1680). Stuttgart: Franz Steiner Verlag.
