= Athanasius Kircher =

German Jesuit scholar and polymath (1602–1680)

The Reverend Athanasius Kircher SJ
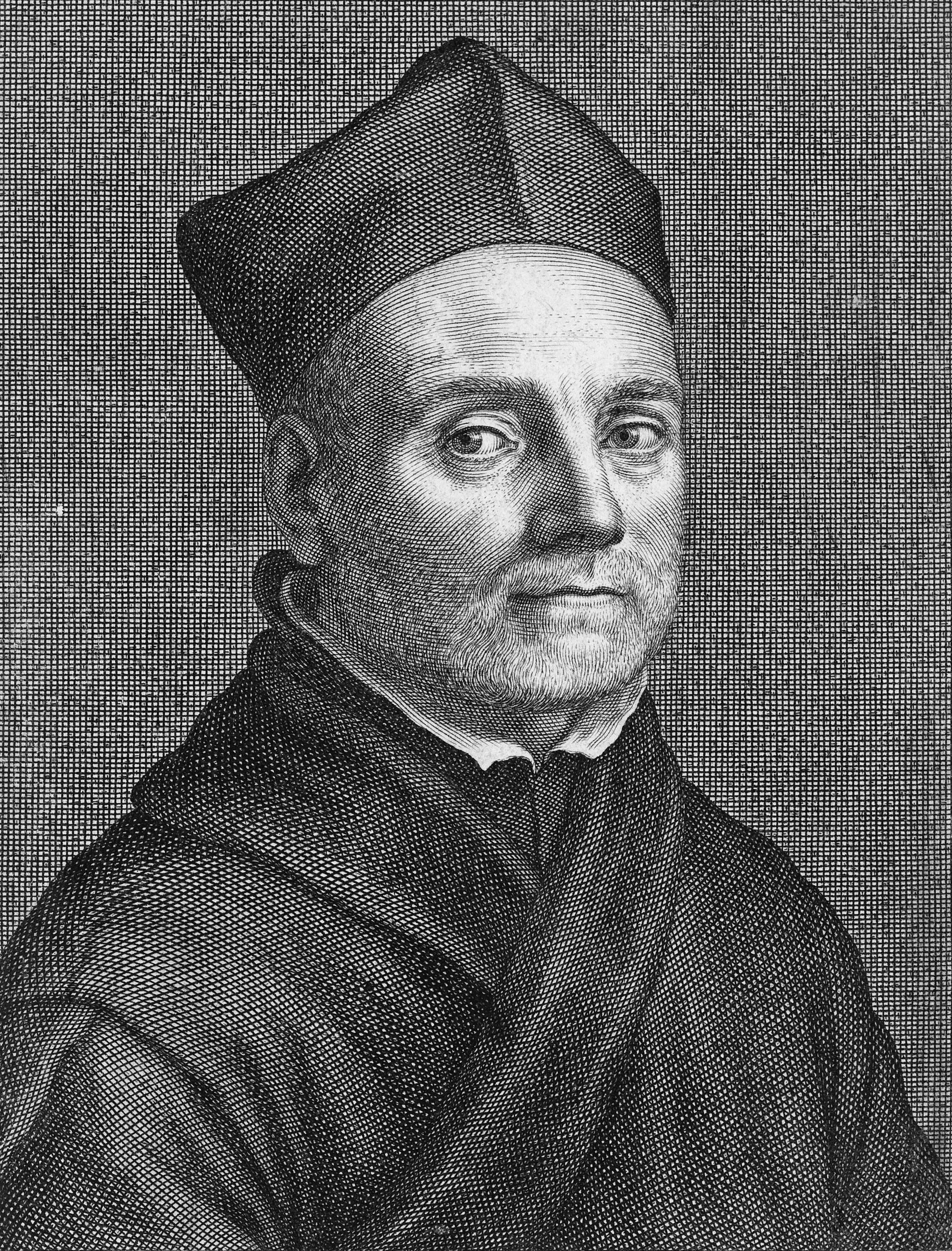
- Portrait from Mundus Subterraneus (1664)
- Born: 2 May 1601/1602; Geisa, Princely Abbey of Fulda
- Died: 27 November 1680 (aged 78 or 79); Rome, Papal States
- Scientific career
- Workplaces: University of Würzburg; University of Avignon; Pontifical Gregorian University

Signature
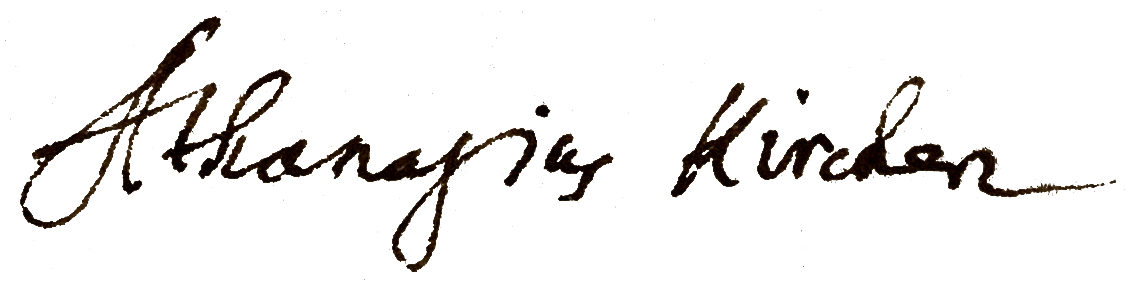

Athanasius Kircher (2 May 1601/1602 – 27 November 1680) was a German Jesuit scholar and polymath who published around 40 major works of comparative religion, geology, and medicine. Kircher has been compared to fellow Jesuit Roger Joseph Boscovich and to Leonardo da Vinci for his vast range of interests, and has been honoured with the title "Master of a Hundred Arts". He taught for more than 40 years at the Roman College, where he set up a wunderkammer or cabinet of curiosities that would become the Kircherian Museum. A resurgence of interest in Kircher has occurred within the scholarly community in recent decades.

Kircher claimed to have deciphered the hieroglyphic writing of the ancient Egyptian language, but most of his assumptions and translations in the field turned out to be wrong. He did, however, correctly establish the link between the ancient Egyptian and the Coptic languages. Erik Iversen was one Egyptologist who (In The Myth of Egypt and its Hieroglyphs, 1961) regarded Kircher as the founder of Egyptology. Kircher was also fascinated with Sinology and wrote an encyclopedia of China, where he revealed the early presence of Nestorian Christians while also attempting to establish links with Egypt and Christianity.

Kircher's work in geology included studies of volcanoes and fossils. One of the first researchers to observe microbes through a microscope, Kircher was ahead of his time in proposing that the plague was caused by an infectious microorganism and in suggesting effective measures to prevent its spread. Kircher also displayed a keen interest in technology and mechanical inventions; inventions attributed to him include a magnetic clock, various automatons and the first megaphone. The invention of the magic lantern has been misattributed to Kircher, although he conducted a study of the principles involved in his Ars Magna Lucis et Umbrae.

A scientific star in his day, towards the end of his life he was eclipsed by the rationalism of René Descartes and others. In the late 20th century, however, the aesthetic qualities of his work again began to be appreciated. One modern scholar, Alan Cutler, described Kircher as "a giant among seventeenth-century scholars", and "one of the last thinkers who could rightfully claim all knowledge as his domain". Another scholar, Edward W. Schmidt, referred to Kircher as "the last Renaissance man". In A Man of Misconceptions, his 2012 book about Kircher, John Glassie wrote "many of Kircher's actual ideas today seem wildly off-base, if not simply bizarre," but he was "a champion of wonder, a man of awe-inspiring erudition and inventiveness," whose work was read "by the smartest minds of the time."

== Life ==
Kircher was born on 2 May in either 1601 or 1602 (he himself did not know) in Geisa, Buchonia, near Fulda (Hessen, Germany). From his birthplace, he took the epithets Bucho, Buchonius and Fuldensis which he sometimes added to his name. He attended the Jesuit College in Fulda from 1614 to 1618, when he entered the novitiate of the Society.

The youngest of nine children, Kircher studied volcanoes owing to his passion for rocks and eruptions. He was taught Hebrew by a rabbi in addition to his studies at school. He studied philosophy and theology at Paderborn but fled to Cologne in 1622 to escape advancing Protestant forces during the Thirty Years' War.

From 1622 to 1624, he spent his regency period in Koblenz as a teacher. This was followed by assignment to Heiligenstadt, where he taught mathematics, Hebrew and Syriac, and produced a show of fireworks and moving scenery for the visiting Elector Archbishop of Mainz, showing early evidence of his interest in mechanical devices. He was ordained to the priesthood in 1628 and became professor of ethics and mathematics at the University of Würzburg, where he also taught Hebrew and Syriac. Beginning in 1628, he began to show an interest in Egyptian hieroglyphs.

In 1631, while still at Würzburg, Kircher allegedly had a prophetic vision of bright light and armed men with horses in the city. Würzburg was attacked shortly afterwards and captured, leading to Kircher being accorded respect for predicting the disaster via astrology, though Kircher privately insisted that he had not relied on it. This was the year that Kircher published his first book (the Ars Magnesia, reporting his research on magnetism), but having been caught up in the Thirty Years' War he was driven to the papal University of Avignon in France. In 1633 he was called to Vienna by the emperor to succeed Kepler as Mathematician to the Habsburg court. On the intervention of Nicolas-Claude Fabri de Peiresc, the order was rescinded, and he was sent instead to Rome to continue with his scholarly work, but he had already embarked for Vienna.

On the way, his ship was blown off course and he arrived in Rome before he knew of the changed destination. He based himself in the city for the rest of his life, and from 1634 he taught mathematics, physics and Oriental languages at the Collegio Romano (now the Pontifical Gregorian University) for several years before being released to devote himself to research. He studied malaria and the plague, amassing a collection of antiquities, which he exhibited along with devices of his own creation in the Museum Kircherianum.

In 1661, Kircher discovered the ruins of a church said to have been constructed by Constantine on the site of Saint Eustace's vision of a crucifix in a stag's horns. He raised money to pay for the church's reconstruction as the Santuario della Mentorella, and his heart was buried in the church upon his death.

== Works ==
Frontispiece to Kircher's Latium.

Kircher published many substantial books on a wide variety of subjects such as Egyptology, geology, and music theory. His syncretic approach disregarded conventional boundaries between disciplines: his Magnes, for example, ostensibly discussed magnetism, but also explored other modes of attraction such as gravity and love. Perhaps Kircher's best-known work is Oedipus Aegyptiacus (1652–54), a vast study of Egyptology and comparative religion.

His books, written in Latin, were widely circulated in the 17th century and contributed to the wide dissemination of scientific information. Kircher is not considered to have made any significant original contributions, although some discoveries and inventions (e.g., the magic lantern) have sometimes been mistakenly attributed to him.

In his foreword to Ars Magna Sciendi Sive Combinatoria (The Great Art of Knowledge, or the Combinatorial Art), the inscription reads:

"Nothing is more beautiful than to know all."

=== Linguistic and cultural studies ===
==== Egyptology ====
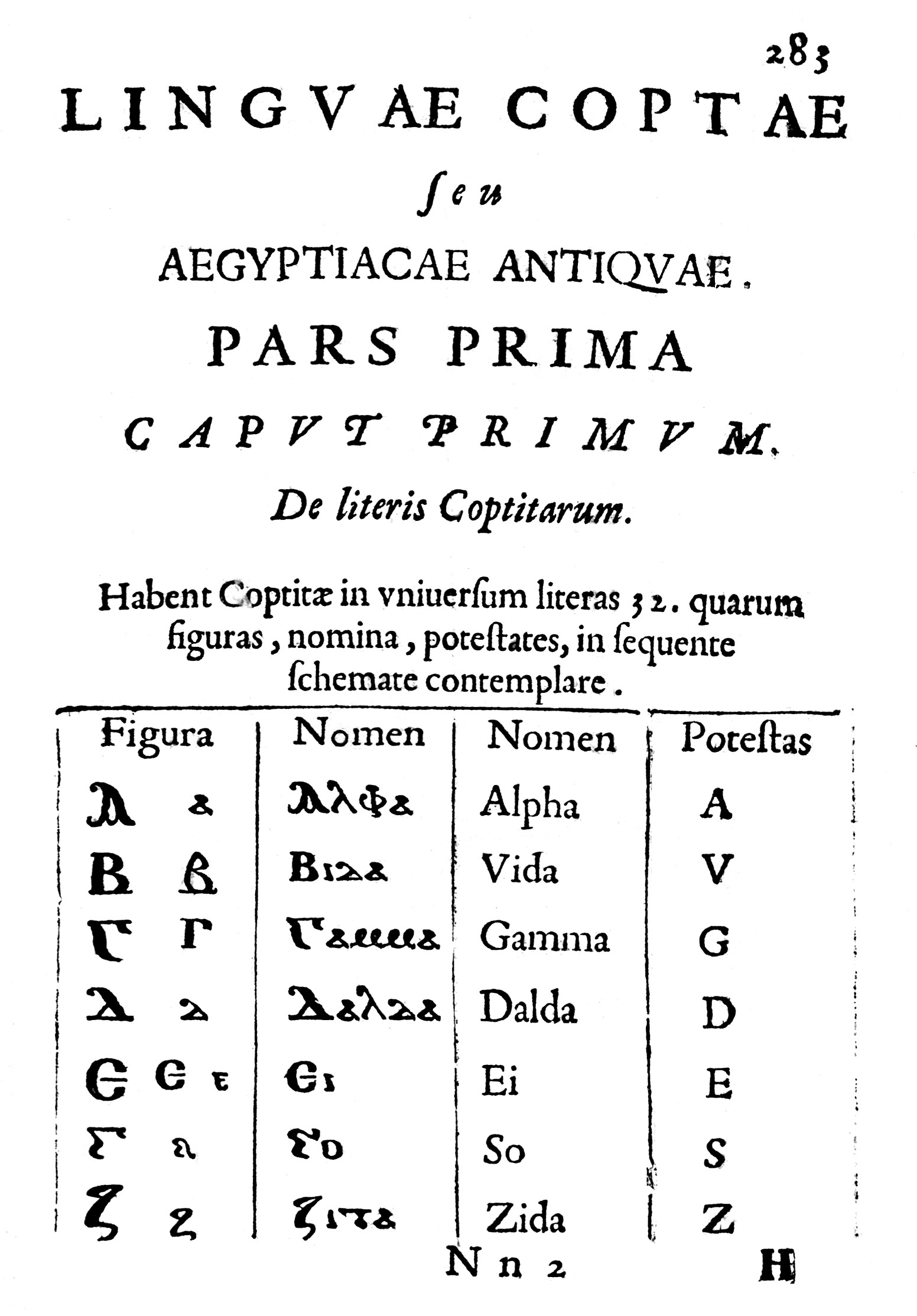
The Coptic alphabet, from Prodromus Coptus sive aegyptiacus.

The last known example of Egyptian hieroglyphics dates from AD 394, after which all knowledge of hieroglyphics was lost. Until Thomas Young and Jean-François Champollion found the key to hieroglyphics in the 19th century, the main authority was the 4th-century Greek grammarian Horapollon, whose chief contribution was the misconception that hieroglyphics were "picture writing" and that future translators should look for symbolic meaning in the pictures.

The first modern study of hieroglyphics came with Piero Valeriano Bolzani's Hieroglyphica (1556). Kircher was the most famous of the "decipherers" between ancient and modern times and the most famous Egyptologist of his day. In his Lingua Aegyptiaca Restituta (1643), Kircher called hieroglyphics "this language hitherto unknown in Europe, in which there are as many pictures as letters, as many riddles as sounds, in short as many mazes to be escaped from as mountains to be climbed". While some of his notions are long discredited, portions of his work have been valuable to later scholars, and Kircher helped pioneer Egyptology as a field of serious study.

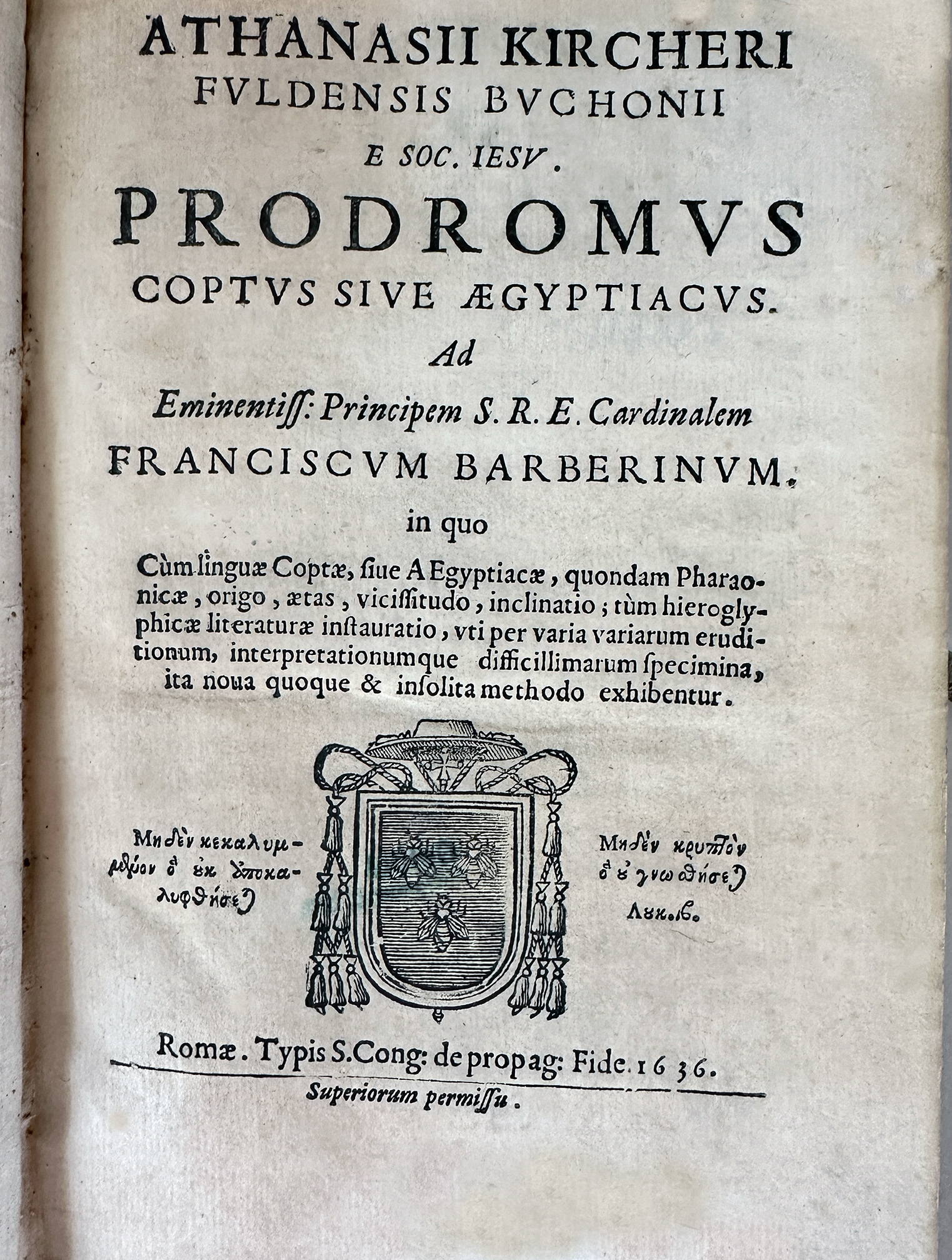
Athanasius Kircher, Prodromus Coptus Sive Aegyptiacus, Rome 1636

Kircher's interest in Egyptology began in 1628 when he became intrigued by a collection of hieroglyphs in the library at Speyer. He learned Coptic in 1633 and published its first grammar in 1636, the Prodromus coptus sive aegyptiacus. Kircher then broke with Horapollon's interpretation of hieroglyphs with his Lingua aegyptiaca restituta. Kircher argued that Coptic preserved the last development of ancient Egyptian. For this Kircher has been considered the true "founder of Egyptology", because his work was conducted "before the discovery of the Rosetta Stone rendered Egyptian hieroglyphics comprehensible to scholars". He also recognized the relationship between hieratic and hieroglyphic scripts.

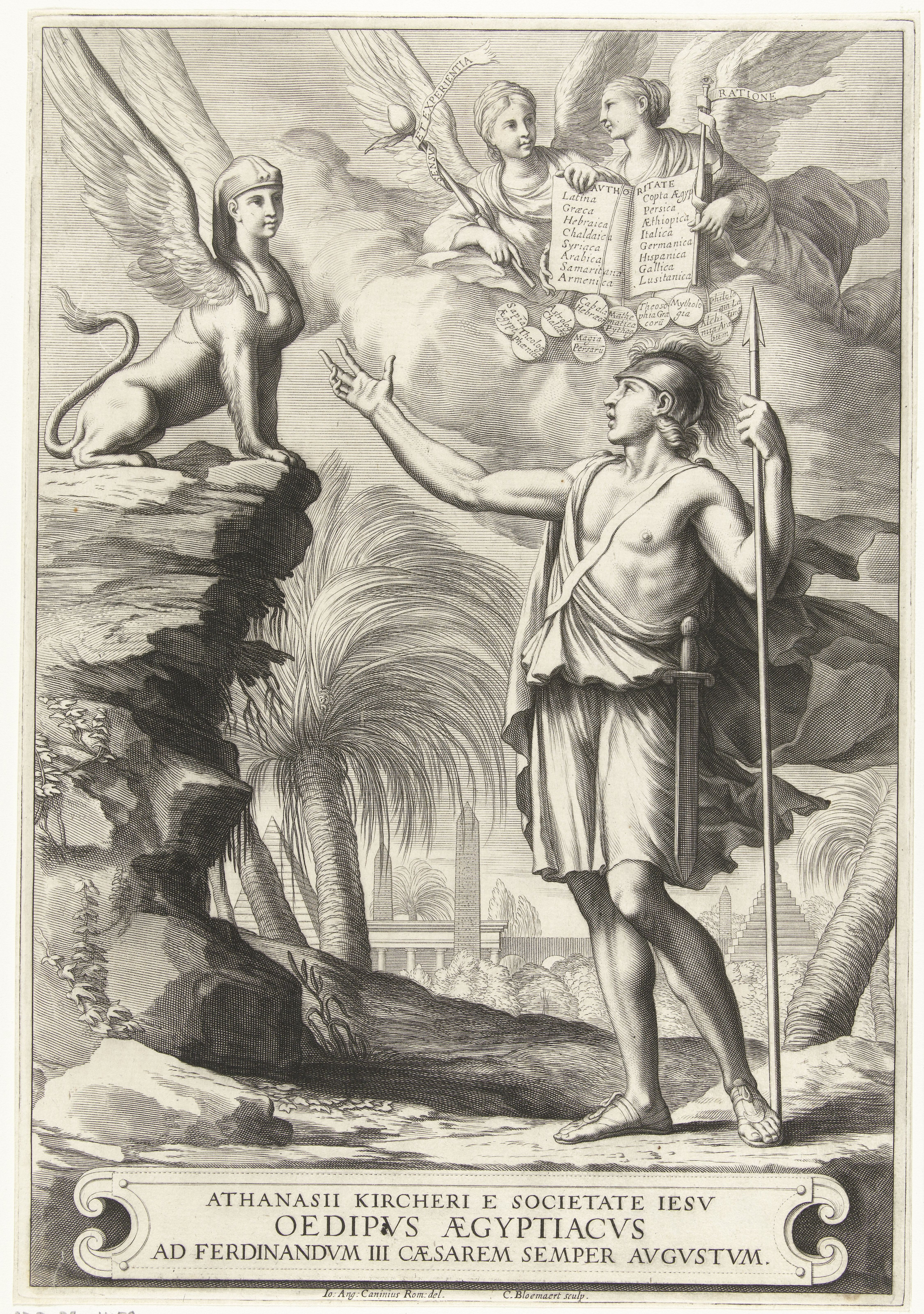
Frontispiece to Kircher's Oedipus Ægyptiacus; the Sphinx, confronted by Kircher's learning, admits he has solved her riddle.

Between 1650 and 1654, Kircher published four volumes of "translations" of hieroglyphs in the context of his Coptic studies. However, according to Steven Frimmer, "none of them even remotely fitted the original texts". In Oedipus Aegyptiacus, Kircher argued under the impression of the Hieroglyphica that ancient Egyptian was the language spoken by Adam and Eve, that Hermes Trismegistus was Moses, and that hieroglyphs were occult symbols which "cannot be translated by words, but expressed only by marks, characters and figures." This led him to translate the simple hieroglyphic text ḏd Wsr ("Osiris says") as "The treachery of Typhon ends at the throne of Isis; the moisture of nature is guarded by the vigilance of Anubis".

Egyptologist E. A. Wallis Budge mentioned Kircher as the foremost of writers who "pretended to have found the key to the hieroglyphics" and called his translations in Oedipus Aegyptiacus "utter nonsense, but as they were put forth in a learned tongue many people at the time believed they were correct." Although Kircher's approach to deciphering texts was based on a fundamental misconception, some modern commentators have described Kircher as the pioneer of the serious study of hieroglyphs. The data which he collected were later consulted by Champollion in his successful efforts to decode the script. According to Joseph MacDonnell, it was "because of Kircher's work that scientists knew what to look for when interpreting the Rosetta stone". Another scholar of ancient Egypt, Erik Iversen, concluded:

It is, therefore, Kircher's incontestable merit that he was the first to have discovered the phonetic value of an Egyptian hieroglyph. From a humanistic as well as an intellectual point of view Egyptology may very well be proud of having Kircher as its founder.

Kircher was also actively involved in the erection of the Pamphilj obelisk, and added "hieroglyphs" of his design in the blank areas. Rowland 2002 concluded that Kircher made use of Pythagorean principles to read hieroglyphs of the Pamphili Obelisk, and used the same form of interpretation when reading scripture.

==== Sinology ====
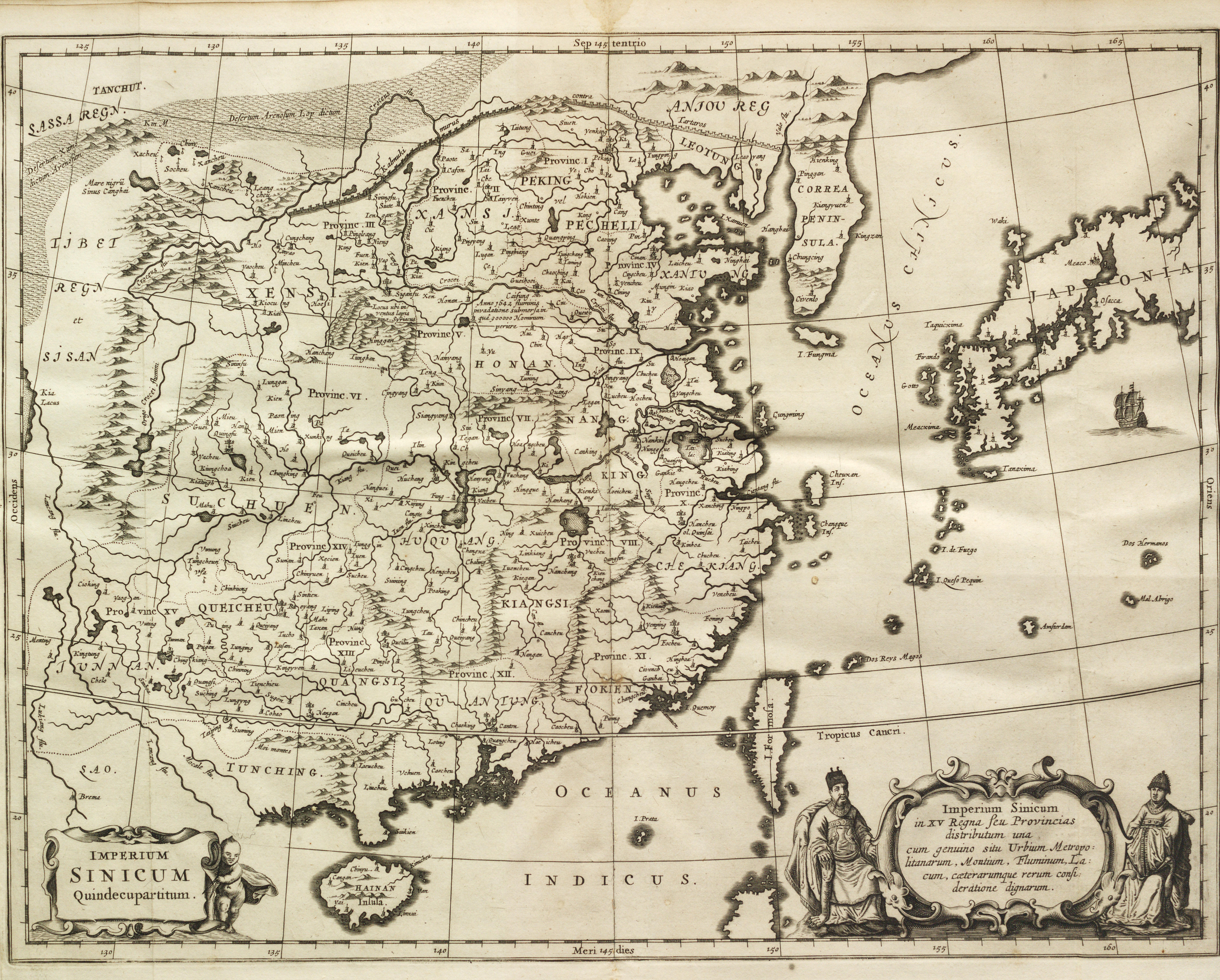
Map of China, China Illustrata.

Kircher had an early interest in China, telling his superior in 1629 that he wished to become a missionary to that country. In 1667 he published a treatise whose full title was China monumentis, qua sacris qua profanis, nec non variis naturae & artis spectaculis, aliarumque rerum memorabilium argumentis illustrata, and which is commonly known simply as China Illustrata, i.e. "China Illustrated". It was a work of encyclopedic breadth, combining material of unequal quality, from accurate cartography to mythical elements, such as a study of dragons. The work drew heavily on the reports of Jesuits working in China, in particular Michael Boym and Martino Martini.

China Illustrata emphasized the Christian elements of Chinese history, both real and imagined: the book noted the early presence of Nestorian Christians (with a Latin translation of the Nestorian Stele of Xi'an provided by Boym and his Chinese collaborator, Andrew Zheng), but also claimed that the Chinese were descended from the sons of Ham, that Confucius was Hermes Trismegistus/Moses and that the Chinese characters were abstracted hieroglyphs.

In Kircher's system, ideograms were inferior to hieroglyphs because they referred to specific ideas rather than to mysterious complexes of ideas, while the signs of the Maya and Aztecs were yet lower pictograms which referred only to objects. Umberto Eco comments that this idea reflected and supported the ethnocentric European attitude toward Chinese and native American civilizations:

"China was presented not as an unknown barbarian to be defeated but as a prodigal son who should return to the home of the common father". (p. 69)

==== Biblical studies and exegesis ====
In 1675, he published Arca Noë, the results of his research on the biblical Ark of Noah — following the Counter-Reformation, allegorical interpretation was giving way to the study of the Old Testament as literal truth among Scriptural scholars. Kircher analyzed the dimensions of the Ark; based on the number of species known to him (excluding insects and other forms thought to arise spontaneously), he calculated that overcrowding would not have been a problem. He also discussed the logistics of the Ark voyage, speculating on whether extra livestock was brought to feed carnivores and what the daily schedule of feeding and caring for animals must have been.

==== Other cultural work ====
Kircher was sent the Voynich Manuscript in 1665 by Johannes Marcus Marci in the hope of Kircher being able to decipher it. The manuscript remained in the Collegio Romano until Victor Emmanuel II of Italy annexed the Papal States in 1870, though scepticism as to the authenticity of the story and of the origin of the manuscript itself exists. In his Polygraphia Nova (1663), Kircher proposed an artificial universal language.

=== Physical sciences ===
==== Geology ====
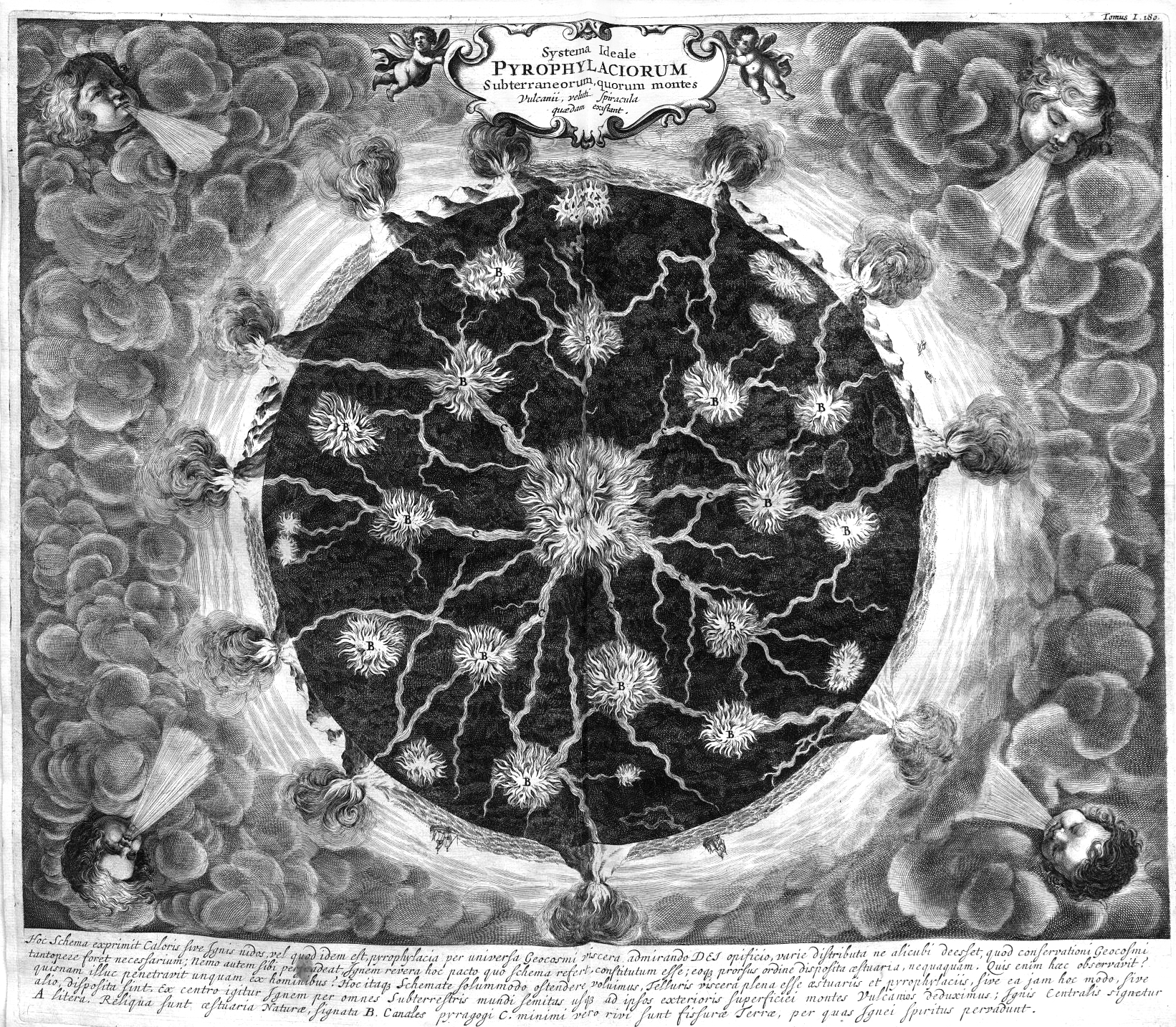
Kircher's model of the Earth's internal fires, from Mundus Subterraneus.

On a visit to southern Italy in 1638, the ever-curious Kircher was lowered into the crater of Vesuvius, then on the brink of eruption, to examine its interior. He was also intrigued by the subterranean rumbling which he heard at the Strait of Messina. His geological and geographical investigations culminated in his Mundus Subterraneus of 1664, in which he suggested that the tides were caused by water moving to and from a subterranean ocean.

Kircher was also puzzled by fossils. He understood that fossils were the remains of animals. He ascribed large bones to giant races of humans. Not all the objects which he was attempting to explain were in fact fossils, hence the diversity of explanations. He interpreted mountain ranges as the Earth's skeletal structures exposed by weathering.

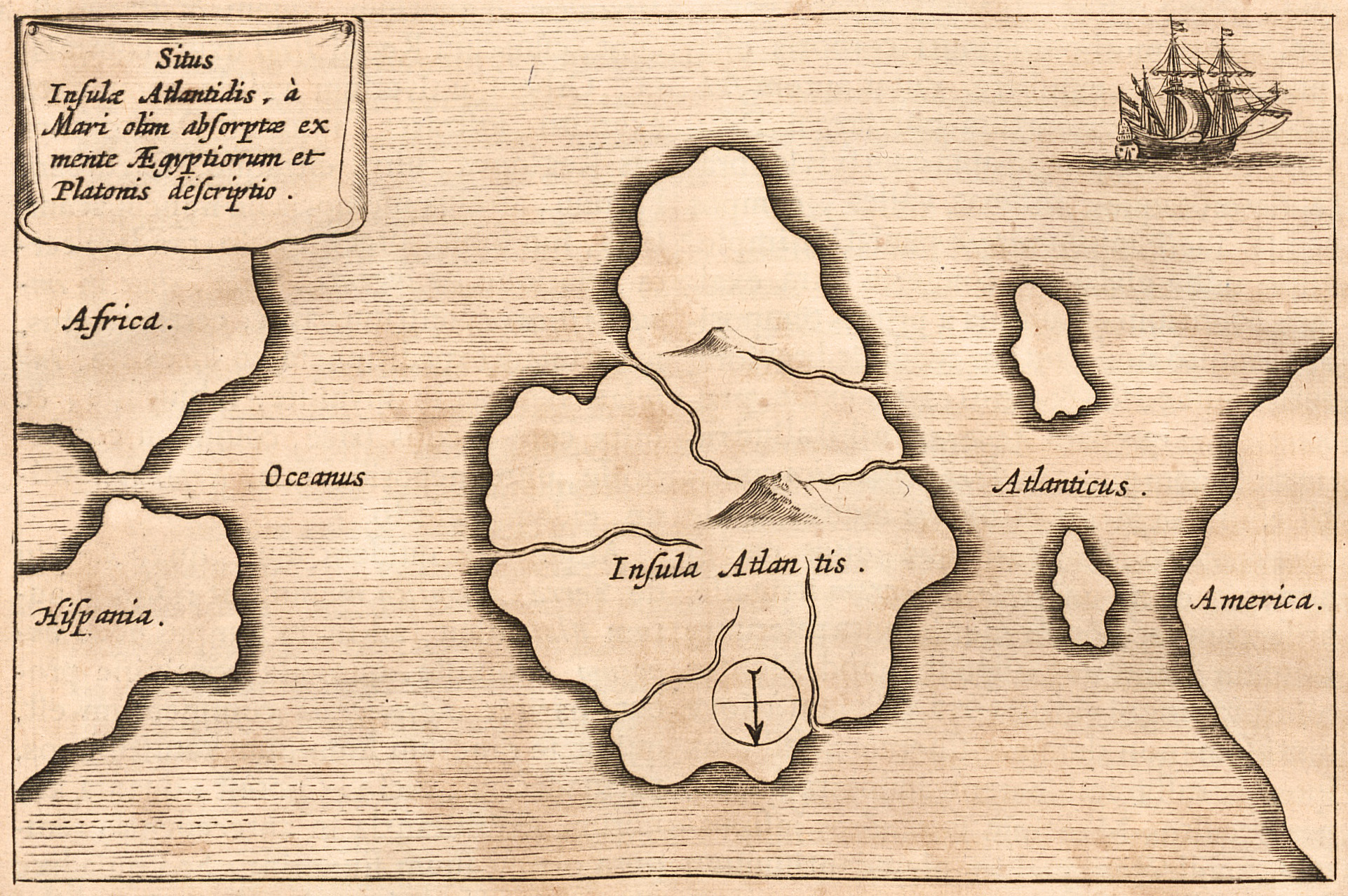
Kircher's map of Atlantis, oriented with south at the top, from Mundus Subterraneus.

Mundus Subterraneus includes several pages about the legendary island of Atlantis including a map with the Latin caption "Situs Insulae Atlantidis, a Mari olim absorpte ex mente Egyptiorum et Platonis Description," translating as "Site of the island of Atlantis, in the sea, from Egyptian sources and Plato's description."

==== Biology ====
In his book Arca Noë, Kircher argued that after the Flood new species were transformed as they moved into different environments, for example, when a deer moved into a colder climate, it became a reindeer. He wrote that many species were hybrids of other species, for example, armadillos from a combination of turtles and porcupines. He also advocated the theory of spontaneous generation. Because of such hypotheses, some historians have held that Kircher was a proto-evolutionist.

==== Medicine ====
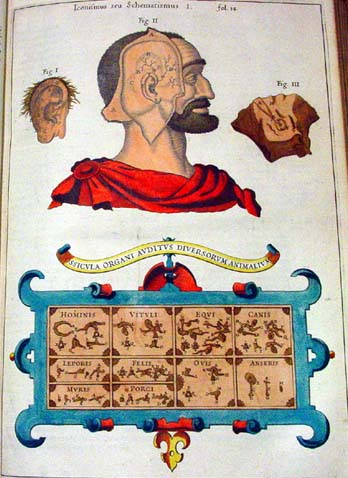
The ears of a human, cow, horse, dog, leopard, cat, rat, pig, sheep and goose illustrated in Musurgia Universalis.

Kircher took a modern approach to the study of diseases as early as 1646 by using a microscope to investigate the blood of plague victims. In his Scrutinium Pestis of 1658, he observed the presence of "little worms" or "animalcules" in the blood and concluded that the disease was caused by microorganisms. That was correct, although it is likely that what he saw were red or white blood cells and not the plague agent, Yersinia pestis. He also proposed hygienic measures to prevent the spread of disease, such as isolation, quarantine, burning clothes worn by the infected and wearing facemasks to prevent the inhalation of germs.

=== Technology ===
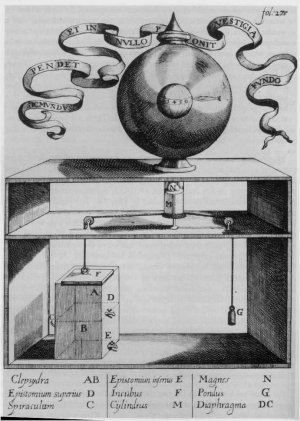
Kircher's magnetic clock.

In 1646, Kircher published Ars Magna Lucis et Umbrae, concerning the display of images on a screen using an apparatus similar to the magic lantern developed by Christiaan Huygens and others. Kircher described the construction of a "catoptric lamp" that used reflection to project images on the wall of a darkened room. Although Kircher did not invent the device, he improved it and suggested methods by which exhibitors could use his device. Much of the significance of his work arises from Kircher's rational approach towards the demystification of projected images.

Kircher constructed a magnetic clock, which he explained in his Magnes (1641). The clock had been invented by another Jesuit, Fr. Linus of Liege, and was described by an acquaintance of Line's in 1634. Kircher's patron Peiresc had claimed that the clock's motion supported the Copernican cosmological model, arguing that the magnetic sphere in the clock rotated by the magnetic force of the sun.

Kircher's model disproved that hypothesis, showing that the motion could be produced by a water clock in the base of the device. Although Kircher disputed the Copernican model in his Magnes, supporting instead that of Tycho Brahe, his later Itinerarium exstaticum (1656, revised 1671), presented several systems — including the Copernican — as distinct possibilities. The clock has been reconstructed by Caroline Bouguereau in collaboration with Michael John Gorman and is on display at the Green Library at Stanford University.

The Musurgia Universalis (1650) sets out Kircher's views on music: he believed that the harmony of music reflected the proportions of the universe. The book includes plans for constructing water-powered automatic organs, notations of birdsong and diagrams of musical instruments. One illustration shows the differences between the ears of humans and other animals. In Phonurgia Nova (1673), Kircher considered the possibilities of transmitting music to remote places. Other machines designed by Kircher include an aeolian harp, automatons such as a statue which spoke and listened via a speaking tube, a perpetual motion machine, and a Katzenklavier ("cat piano"). The Katzenklavier would have driven spikes into the tails of cats, which would yowl to specified pitches but was never constructed.

In Phonurgia Nova, literally "new methods of sound production", Kircher examined acoustic phenomena. He explored the use of horns and cones in amplifying sound for architectural applications. He also examined echoes in rooms using domes of different shapes, including the muffling effect of an elliptical dome from Heidelberg. In one section he explored the therapeutic effects of music in tarantism, a theme from southern Italy.

=== Combinatorics ===
Although Kircher's work was not mathematically based, he did develop systems for generating and counting all combinations of a finite collection of objects (i.e., a finite set), based on the previous work of Ramon Llull. His methods and diagrams are discussed in Ars Magna Sciendi, sive Combinatoria, 1669. They include what may be the first recorded drawings of complete bipartite graphs, extending a similar technique used by Llull to visualize complete graphs. Kircher also employed combinatorics in his Arca Musarithmica, an aleatoric music device capable of composing millions of church hymns by combining randomly selected musical phrases.

== Legacy ==
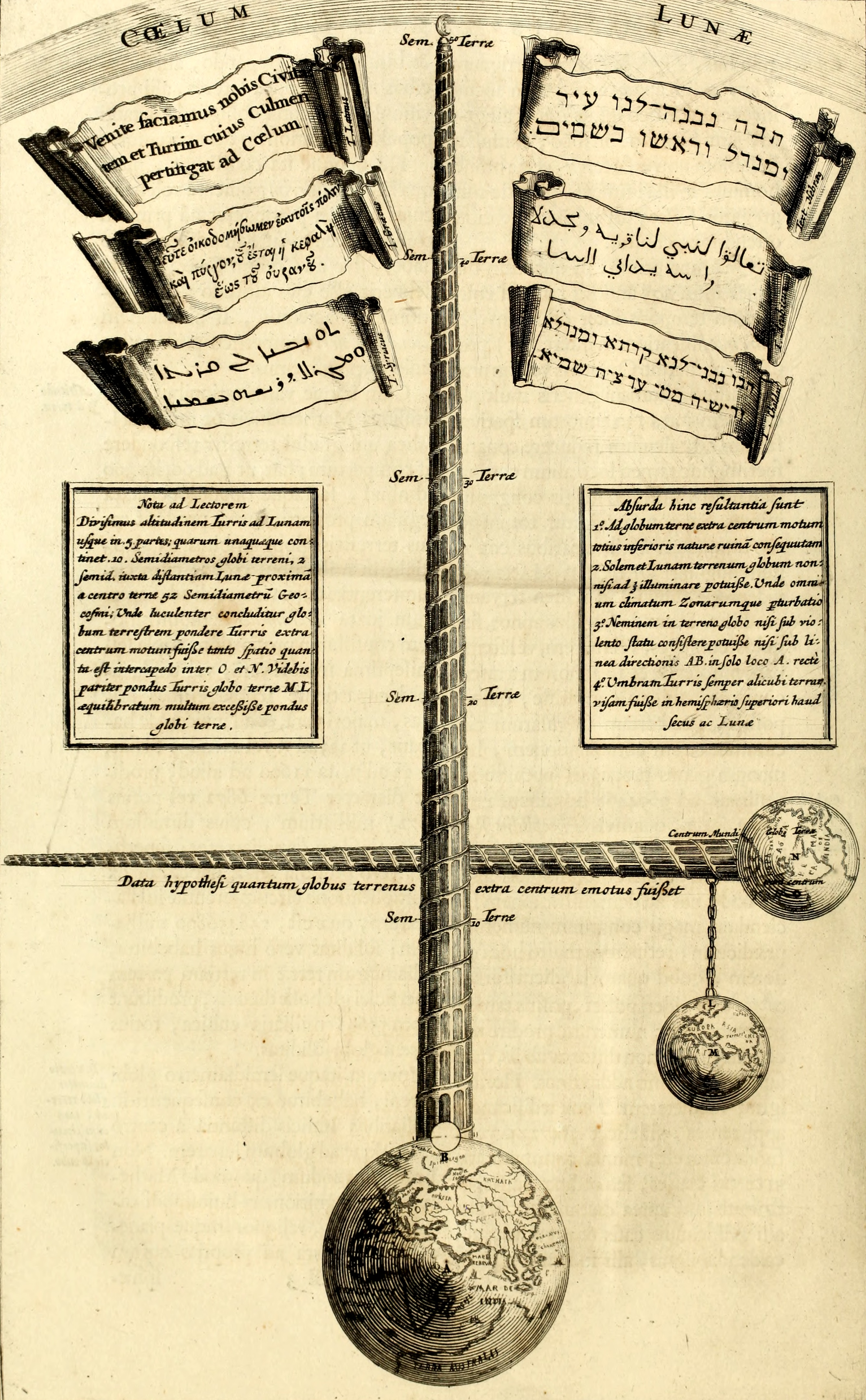
Turris Babel: with typical eclecticism, Kircher illustrates the impossibility of the Tower of Babel reaching the moon, 1679

=== Scholarly influence ===
For most of his professional life, Kircher was one of the scientific stars of his world: according to historian Paula Findlen, he "had a global reputation that was virtually unsurpassed by any early modern author". His importance was twofold: to the results of his own experiments and research he added information gleaned from his correspondence with over 760 scientists, physicians and above all his fellow Jesuits in all parts of the globe. The Encyclopædia Britannica calls him a "one-man intellectual clearing house".

His works, illustrated to his orders, were extremely popular, and he was the first scientist to be able to support himself through the sale of his books. His near-exact contemporary, the English philosopher-physician, Sir Thomas Browne (1605–82) collected his books avidly while his eldest son Edward Browne in 1665 visited the Jesuit priest resident at Rome. Towards the end of Kircher's life, however, his stock fell, as the rationalist Cartesian approach began to dominate (Descartes himself described Kircher as "more quacksalver than savant").

=== Cultural legacy ===
Kircher was largely neglected until the late 20th century. One writer attributes his rediscovery to the similarities between his eclectic approach and postmodernism. As few of Kircher's works have been translated, the contemporary emphasis has been on their aesthetic qualities rather than their actual content, and a succession of exhibitions have highlighted the beauty of their illustrations. Historian Anthony Grafton has said that "the staggeringly strange dark continent of Kircher's work [is] the setting for a Borges story that was never written", while Umberto Eco has written about Kircher in his novel The Island of the Day Before, as well as in his non-fiction works The Search for the Perfect Language and Serendipities.

In the historical novel Imprimatur by Monaldi & Sorti (2002), Kircher plays a major role. Shortly after his death, some travellers are locked up in a hotel in Baroque Rome by the papal health authorities because of an epidemic of plague. Kircher's theory about the healing power of music is remembered by the protagonists in various flashbacks and finally provides the key to the puzzle.

In Where Tigers Are At Home, by Jean-Marie Blas de Roblès, the protagonist works on a translation of a bogus 17th-century biography of Kircher.

The contemporary artist Cybèle Varela has paid tribute to Kircher in her exhibition Ad Sidera per Athanasius Kircher, held in the Collegio Romano, in the same place where the Museum Kircherianum was.

The Museum of Jurassic Technology in Los Angeles has a hall dedicated to the life of Kircher. His ethnographic collection is in the Pigorini National Museum of Prehistory and Ethnography in Rome.

John Glassie's book, A Man of Misconceptions, traces connections between Kircher and figures such as Gianlorenzo Bernini, René Descartes, and Isaac Newton. It also suggests influences on Edgar Allan Poe, Franz Anton Mesmer, Jules Verne, and Marcel Duchamp. In the end, Glassie writes, Kircher should be acknowledged “for his effort to know everything and to share everything he knew, for asking a thousand questions about the world around him, and for getting so many others to ask questions about his answers; for stimulating, as well as confounding and inadvertently amusing, so many minds; for having been a source of so many ideas—right, wrong, half-right, half-baked, ridiculous, beautiful, and all-encompassing.”

== In popular culture ==
Kircher's life and research are central to the plot of James Rollin's 2015 novel The Bone Labyrinth.

He is mentioned in The Book of Life, the third book in the All Souls Trilogy by Deborah Harkness. He further appears in two separate episodes in Daniel Kehlmann's novel Tyll (2017). He appears somewhat sympathetically in the first instance, exhibiting qualms of compassion about sentencing a man (Tyll's father) to hanging. In the second, Kircher has become wholly unsympathetic, full of his own self-importance. (Kehlmann telescopes some of Kircher's achievements, such as his hieroglyphic translations, to fit within the novel's chronology.)

The permanent exhibition The World Is Bound with Secret Knots at the Museum of Jurassic Technology is based on the life and work of Kircher and uses elaborate 3D technology to highlight the magical quality of many of his ideas and images.

He is also a character (though largely off-stage, he is often mentioned by other characters) in the "Ring of Fire" alternate history series (published by Baen). In it, he was sent back to Germany in the early 1630s, where he became the unofficial pastor of the Catholic church in the temporally transplanted town of Grantville, Thuringia-Franconia.

Kircher features as a favourite author of Father Chmielowski in Olga Tokarczuk's The Books of Jacob.

== Bibliography ==
Kircher's principal works, in chronological order, are:

Year	Title	Link
1631	Ars Magnesia	
1635	Primitiae gnomoniciae catroptricae	
1636	Prodromus coptus sive aegyptiacus	
1637	Specula Melitensis Encyclica, hoc est syntagma novum instrumentorum physico- mathematicorum	
1641	Magnes sive de Arte Magnetica	1643 edition (second ed.)
1643	Lingua Aegyptiaca Restituta	
1645–1646	Ars Magna Lucis et Umbrae	1646 edition
1650	Obeliscus Pamphilius: hoc est, Interpretatio noua & Hucusque Intentata Obelisci Hieroglyphici	1650 edition
1650	Musurgia universalis, sive ars magna consoni et dissoni	Volumes I and II, 1650
1652–1655	Oedipus Aegyptiacus	
1654	Magnes sive de Arte Magnetica (third, expanded edition)	Text
1656	Itinerarium exstaticum s. opificium coeleste	
1657	Iter exstaticum secundum, mundi subterranei prodromus	
1658	Scrutinium Physico-Medicum Contagiosae Luis, quae dicitur Pestis	
1660	Iter extaticum coeleste	1660 edition
1660	Pantometrum Kircherianum ... explicatum a G. Schotto	
1661	Diatribe de Progidiosis Crucibus	
1663	Polygraphia nova et universalis ex combinatoria arte directa	
1664–1678	Mundus subterraneus, quo universae denique naturae divitiae	Tomus II, 1678 Digital edition Tomus I/II by the University and State Library Düsseldorf
1665	Historia Eustachio Mariana	1665 edition
1665	Arithmologia sive De abditis numerorum mysterijs	1665 edition
1666	Obelisci Aegyptiaci ... interpretatio hieroglyphica	
1667	China monumentis, qua sacris qua profanis, nec non variis naturae & artis spectaculis, aliarumque rerum memorabilium argumentis illustrata	Latin edition (1667) (pages with illustrations only); La Chine, 1670 (French, 1670); Modern English translation
1667	Magneticum naturae regnum sive disceptatio physiologica	1667 edition
1668	Organum mathematicum (contributor, edited and published by Gaspar Schott)	
1669	Principis Cristiani archetypon politicum	1672 edition
1669	Latium	1671 edition
1669	Ars magna sciendi sive combinatoria	1669 edition
1673	Phonurgia Nova, sive conjugium mechanico-physicum artis & natvrae paranympha phonosophia concinnatum	1763 edition
1675	Arca Noë	
1676	Sphinx mystagoga: sive Diatribe hieroglyphica, qua Mumiae, ex Memphiticis Pyramidum Adytis Erutae…	1676 edition
1676	Obelisci Aegyptiaci	
1679	Musaeum Collegii Romani Societatis Jesu	
1679	Turris Babel, Sive Archontologia Qua Primo Priscorum post diluvium hominum vita, mores rerumque gestarum magnitudo, Secundo Turris fabrica civitatumque exstructio, confusio linguarum, & inde gentium transmigrationis, cum principalium inde enatorum idiomatum historia, multiplici eruditione describuntur & explicantur. Amsterdam, Jansson-Waesberge 1679.	
1679	Tariffa Kircheriana sive mensa Pythagorica expansa	1679 edition
1680	Physiologia Kircheriana experimentalis	1680 edition

== See also ==
- Abacus Harmonicus
- Decipherment of Egyptian hieroglyphs
- List of Jesuit scientists
- List of Roman Catholic scientist-clerics
- Library of Sir Thomas Browne
- Filippo Bonanni, S.J., pupil of Kircher
- Cat organ, hypothetical musical instrument invented by Kircher
