= Abaco Dream =

American rock music band

- Origin: New York City, United States
- Years active: Late 1960s - early 1970s
- Label: A&M
- Past members: Paul Douglas; David Williams; Dennis Williams; Frank Maio; Mike Sassano

Abaco Dream was an American rock group from New York City, United States.

== History ==
The members were Paul Douglas, David Williams, Dennis Williams, Frank Maio, and Mike Sassano. Their 1969 release, the Sly Stone-written "Life and Death in G & A", peaked at number 74 on the Billboard Hot 100 and at number 58 on the Cashbox Top 100 (A&M 1081). Another single from the group, "Another Night of Love/Chocolate Pudding", did not chart when released in 1970.

The constant with all four Abaco Dream tracks was the producer Ted Cooper, who was a music executive at Double M Productions at the time, and had previously worked at Epic Records, Sly Stone's record label. Cooper died in 1975.

== Singles discography ==
- A&M 1081 - "Life and Death in G & A" written by Sylvester Stewart / "Cat Woman" written by Eric Siday
- A&M 1160 - "Another Night Of Love" / "Chocolate Pudding" both written by Arthur Miller

"Life and Death in G & A" reached #34 in Canada and "Cat Woman" was #66.

== Sly and the Family Stone ==
Some musicologists, such as Joel Whitburn, believe that "Life and Death in G & A" is actually a performance by Sly and the Family Stone. They note the similarity in performance of this song to other Family Stone songs and the dissimilarity between this song and other Abaco Dream releases. The song also appears on the CD compilation Listen To The Voices: Sly Stone In The Studio 1965-1970, issued by Ace Records. The vocals are attributed to Joe Hicks who, in 1970, performed a cover version for Stone's Stone Flower label.
