= Musurgia Universalis =

1650 work by Athanasius Kircher

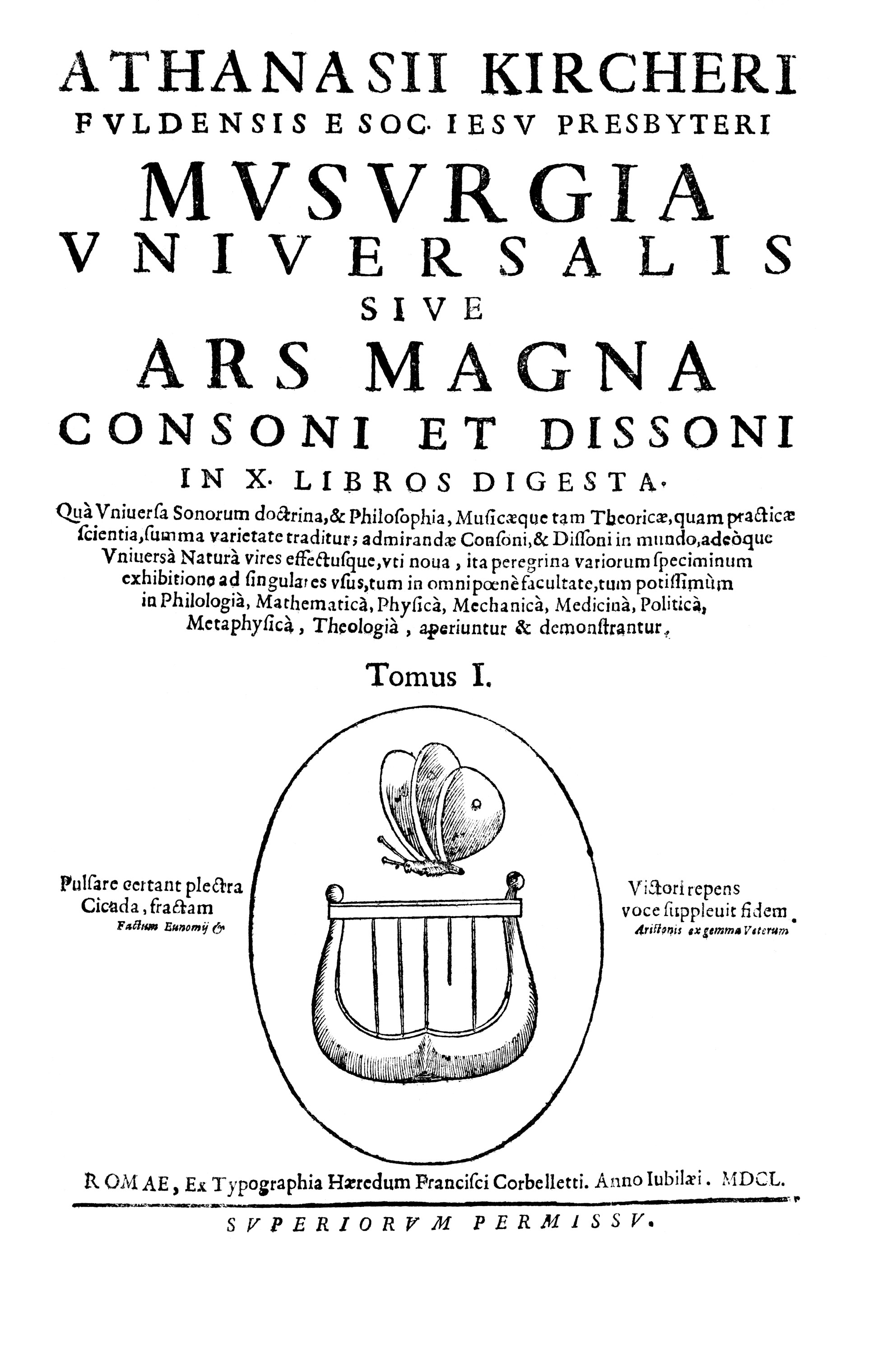
Musurgia

Musurgia Universalis, sive Ars Magna Consoni et Dissoni ("The Universal Musical Art, or the Great Art of Consonance and Dissonance") is a 1650 work by the Jesuit scholar Athanasius Kircher. It was printed in Rome by Ludovico Grignani and dedicated to Archduke Leopold Wilhelm of Austria. It was a compendium of ancient and contemporary thinking about music, its production and its effects. It explored, in particular, the relationship between the mathematical properties of music (e.g. harmony and dissonance) with health and rhetoric. The work complements two of Kircher's other books: Magnes sive de Arte Magnetica had set out the secret underlying coherence of the universe and Ars Magna Lucis et Umbrae had explored the ways of knowledge and enlightenment. What Musurgia Universalis contained, through its exploration of dissonance within harmony, was an explanation of the presence of evil in the world.

== Composition and publication ==
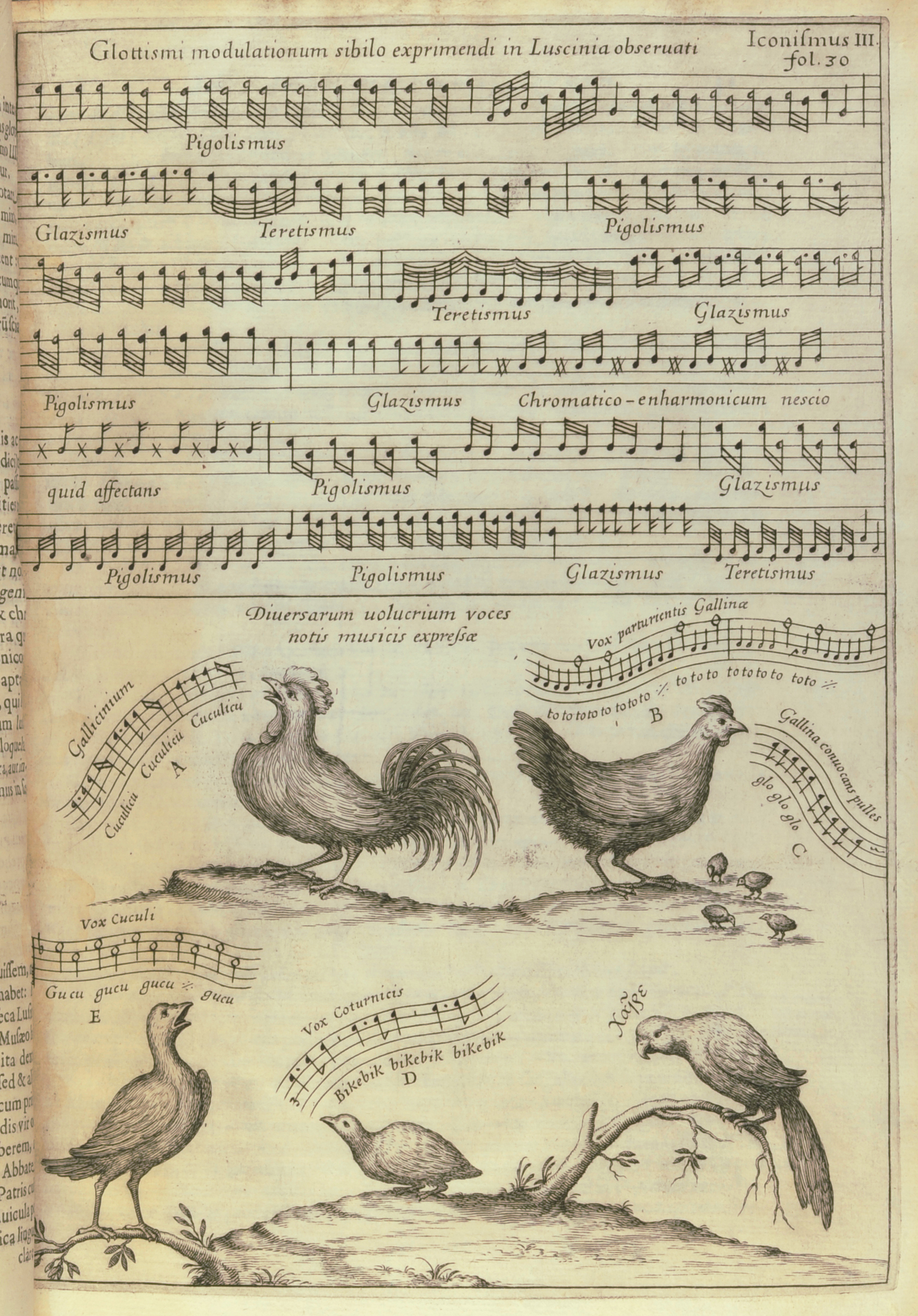
Kircher-musurgia-bird-song

Kircher compiled all the musical knowledge available in his day, making this the first encyclopedia of music. Since its publication it has been a valuable source of information to musicologists about baroque concepts of style and composition. It provides the earliest account of the doctrine of the affections in music. As well as including a three-part fantasy of his own and a composition by Emperor Ferdinand III, Kircher reproduced many musical pieces to illustrate the styles he described, thereby preserving pieces by Frescobaldi, Froberger, and others. Kircher had a number of collaborators who assisted his research with their expertise, and by providing him with examples of different types of music. These included Antonio Maria Abbatini, Giovanni Girolamo Kapsperger and Giacomo Carissimi.

Musurgia Universalis was one of Kircher's largest books. The work was published in two volumes with a total of 1,112 pages and many illustrations. It was one of the most influential books on music theory in the seventeenth century, and of the 1,500 copies known to have been published, 266 are still recorded in various collections. Three hundred copies of the first edition were distributed to Jesuit missionaries who gathered in Rome in 1650 for the election of the new Superior General and carried back to many different lands. In 1656 a Jesuit mission to China took two dozen copies with it when it departed. A second edition was published in Amsterdam in 1662.

== Concepts ==
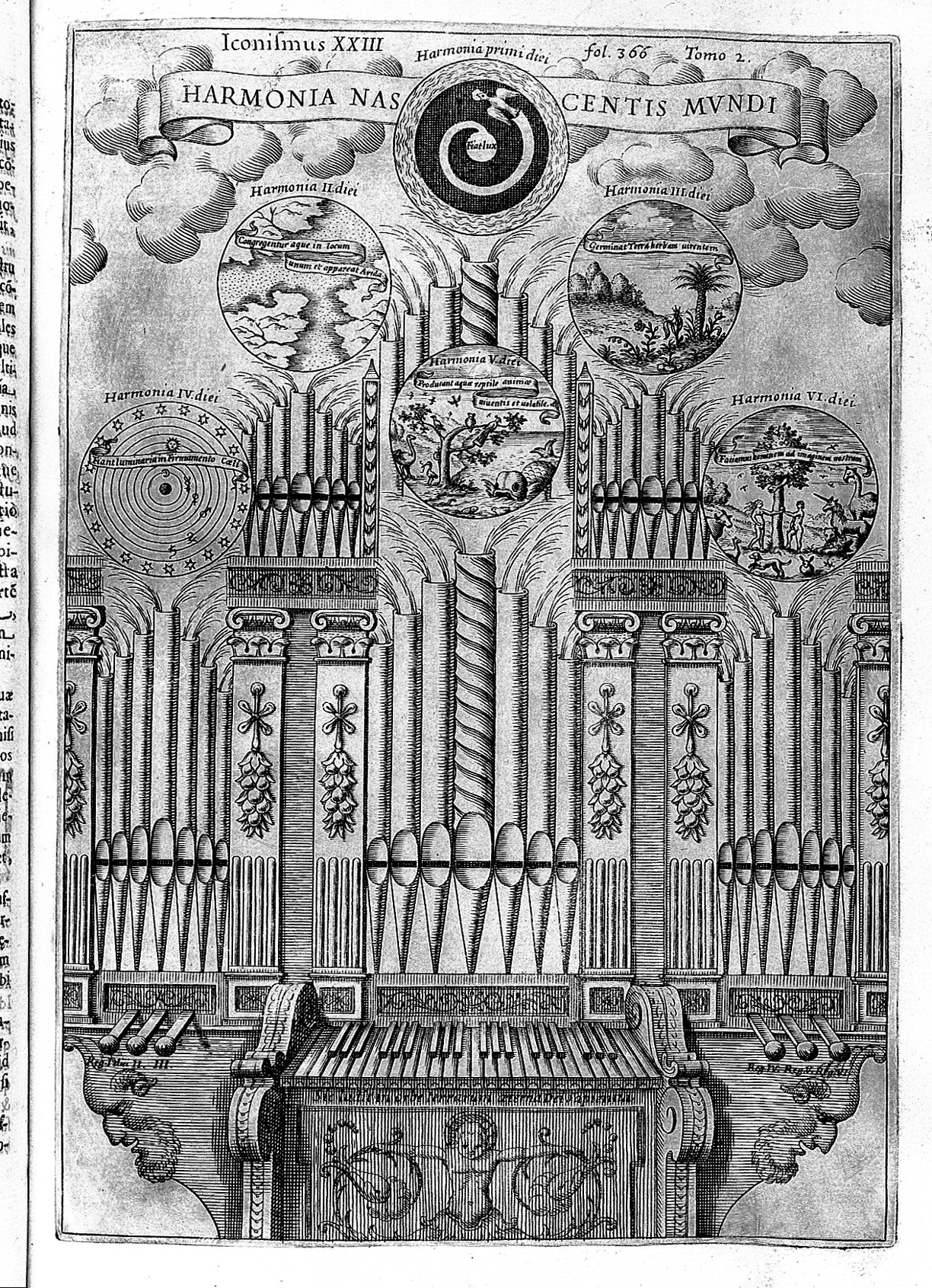
Organ of the world's creation from Book ten of "Musurgia universalis", Wellcome L0025813

The concepts presented in Musurgia Universalis overlap with Kircher's other works - they include musical cryptography (Polygraphia Nova) and tarantism (Magnes sive de Arte Magnetica). There was a detailed discussion of the phenomenon of the echo and its similarity to the reflection of light (Ars Magna Lucis et Umbrae). His account of speaking tubes and amplification was developed in his later work Historia Eustachio Mariana, concerning his installation of trumpets that broadcast a call to prayer at the shrine of Mentorella.

Book eight explained a method for composition and writing harmony that Kircher maintained any person could use, whether they knew anything about music or not. He had invented this system while teaching mathematics at Würzburg University many years previously. This method had great appeal for Jesuits working as missionaries, who sought to use the power of music to draw converts to the Catholic faith by composing hymns in the languages of the people where they were working. Accompanying this method was a description of the arca musurgia, a kind of calculating machine that allowed users to apply Kircher's rules on composition and actually create music. A number of these machines were built and distributed to distinguished patrons together with the book.

After providing the reader with many explanations of physical phenomena and their explanation, as in many of his other works Kircher used the final book to expound the spiritual dimension of everything he has revealed. In Musurgia Universalis he likens the creation of the world to the building of a great organ with six registers corresponding to the six days of creation on which God plays, creating harmony. The illustration shows the elaborately decorated organ with small circular panels illustrating each of the days of creation.

== Structure ==
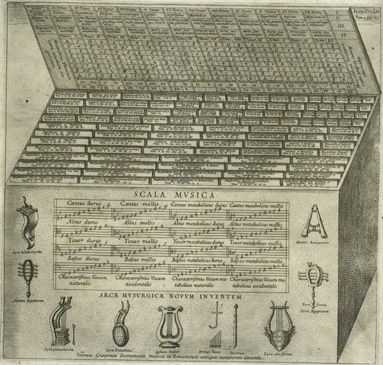
Kircher-ark

- Book one: on physiology, dealing with the structure of the ear, anatomy of the vocal organs, and the sounds made by animals, birds and insects, including the death-song of the swan
- Book two: on philology, the origin of sound, the music of the Hebrews, and the ancient Greeks
- Book three: on arithmetic, with the theory of harmonics, proportion, the ratios of intervals, the Greek scales, the Scale of Guido d'Arezzo, the system of Boethius, and the ancient Greek modes
- Book four: on geometry, discussion of the monochord, and its divisions
- Book five: on organology, based book xii of the Harmonicorum by Marin Mersenne, containing a dissertation on instrumental music
- Book six: on composition, musical notation, counterpoint, and other branches of composition, containing a canon that can be sung by twelve million two hundred thousand voices
- Book seven: on discernment, covering the difference between ancient and modern music
- Books eight: on wonders, including a mathematical method (‘musarithmica’) that allows the most inexperienced to compose with perfection
- Book nine: on the magic of consonance and dissonance and their effects on the mind and body including tarantism
- Book ten: on analogy, discusses the harmony of the spheres, and of the four elements, the principles of harmony exemplified in the proportions of the human body and the affections of the mind, together with practical description of the aeolian harp, which Kircher claimed to have invented.

== Illustrations ==
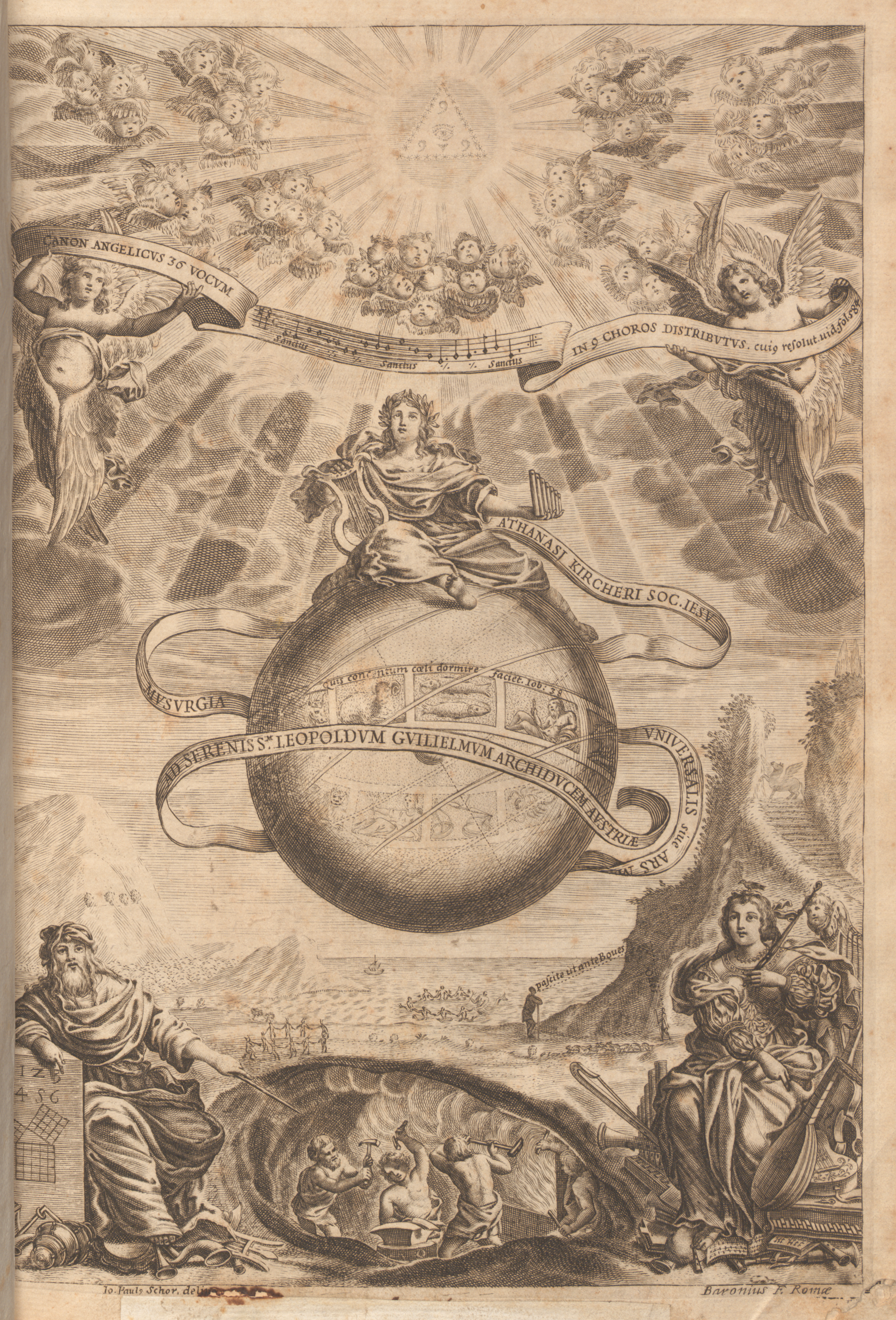
Frontispiece, volume one of "Musurgia Universalis" by Athanasius Kircher, 1650

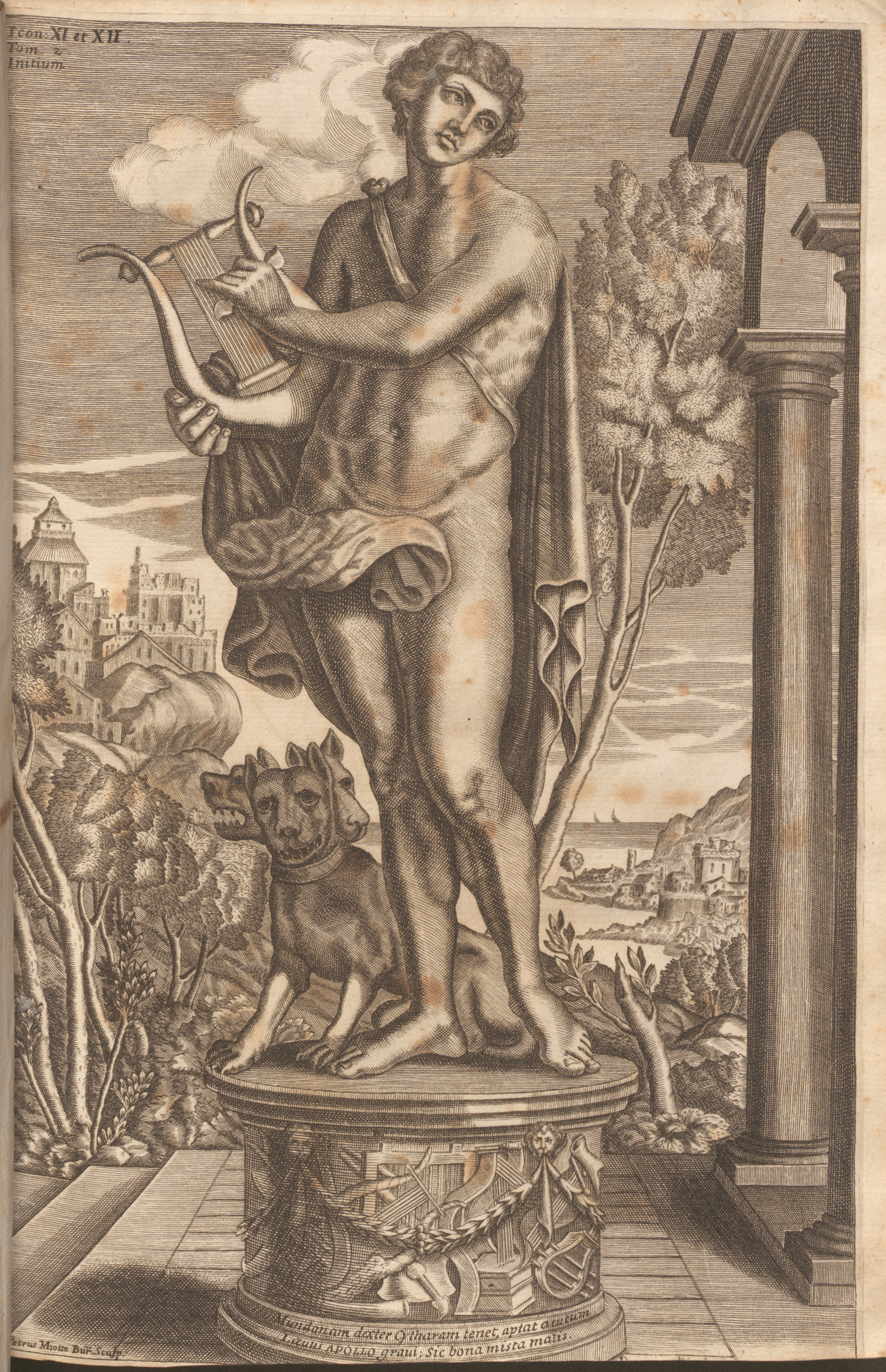
Frontispiece, volume two, "Musurgia Universalis" by Athanasius Kircher, 1650

An engraved portrait of Archduke Leopold Wilhelm faces the frontispiece of volume one, was designed by Johann Paul Schor and engraved by Paulus Pontius, a student of Rubens. It is dated 'Antwerp 1649'.

Each of the work's two volumes had its own frontispiece. For volume one this followed the design common to many of Kircher's works, depicting a threefold universe with the divine at the top, the celestial in the middle and the earthly below. At the top the eye of God overlooks all from within a triangle which bathes choirs of angels in divine light. Two angels hold aloft a banner proclaiming the sanctus as a 'Canon angelicus 36 vocum... in 9 choros distributus' ('a 36-voice canon of angels, divided into nine choirs'). Beneath this sits Apollo on the celestial sphere, holding the lyre that symbolises harmony and pushing away the panpipes associated with his rival Marsyas. Together with the signs of the zodiac, the sphere carries a quotation from the Book of Job (38:37): 'Quis concentum coeli dormire faciet?' ('Who shall make the concert of heaven to sleep?'). At the bottom left of the image Pythagoras sits, with one arm resting on this theorem and the other pointing towards a group of smiths, the sound of whose Pythagorean hammers striking metal is said to have first given him the notion of the mathematical basis of harmony. In the centre are a ring of dancing pans on land, and to their right, a triton dancing in the water with mermaids. On the right there is an illustration of an echo, a topic discussed in the work, with a shepherd reciting a line from Virgil ("pascite, ut ante, boves") and a listener mishearing only the last part of the final word. The echo rebounds from the side of Mount Helicon, where Pegasus strikes the rock with his hoof, bringing forth the stream of Hippocrene that flows down to the figure of Muses surrounded by musical instruments.

The frontispiece for volume two was designed by Pierre Miotte. It depicts Orpheus with his lyre and the three-headed guardian of the underworld, Cerberus. The motto around his pedestal reads 'Apollo's right hand holds the lyre of the world, his left fits high to low; thus good things are mingled with ill.'
