= Organum Mathematicum =

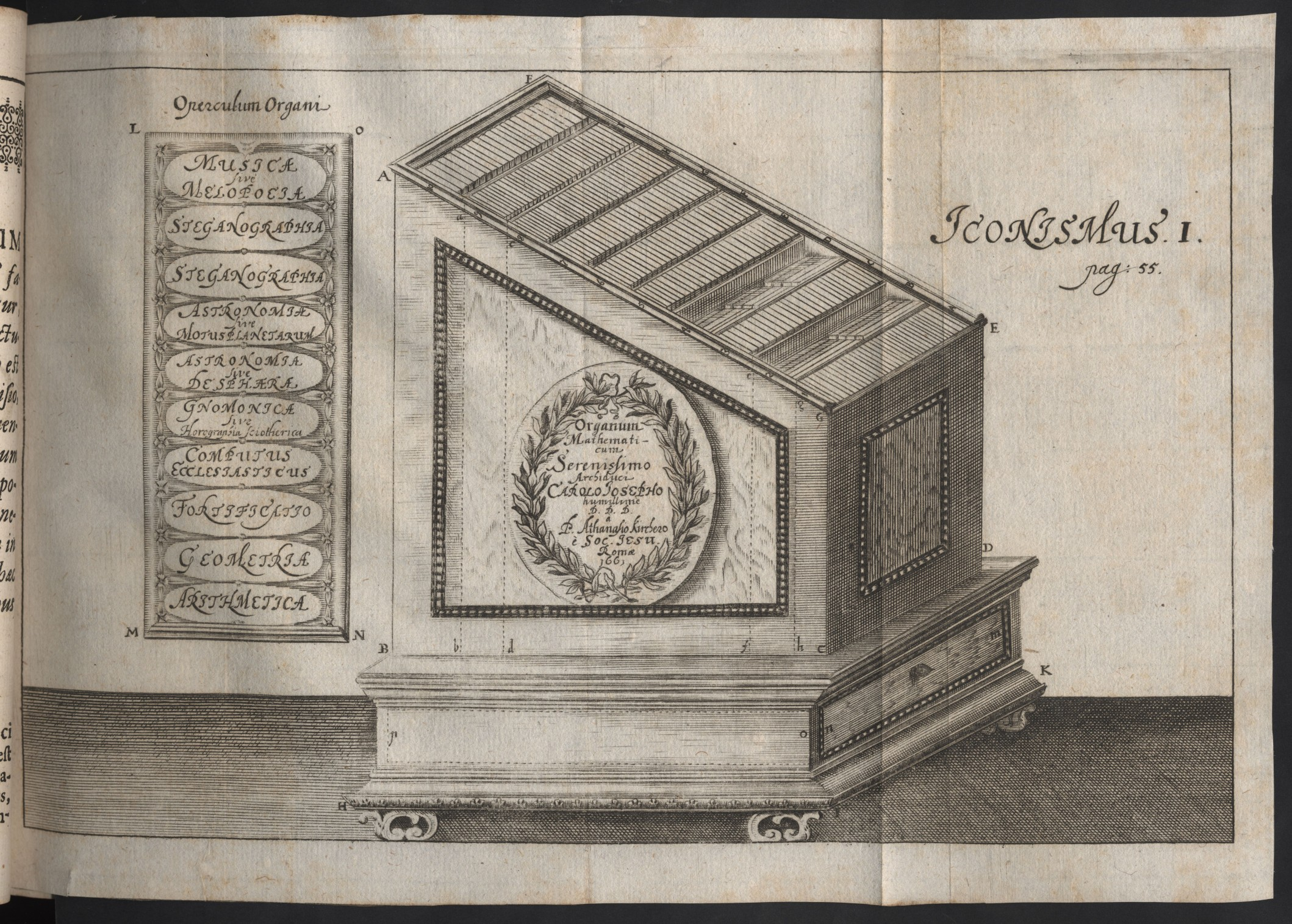
The Organum Mathematicum of Athanasius Kircher

The Organum Mathematicum was an information device or teaching machine that was invented by the Jesuit polymath and scholar Athanasius Kircher in the middle of the 17th century. With proper instruction and use, the device could assist in a wide assortment of calculations, including arithmetic, cryptography, and music.

Kircher adopted some of the ideas in the Organum from preexisting inventions like Napier's bones, almanacs, and his own Arca Musarithmica. Like other calculating devices of the period, the Organum prefigures modern computing technology. Yet, due to its general lack of adoption, it remains an interesting but obscure footnote in the history of information technology.

== Description and layout ==
The Organum Mathematicum was a box or chest divided into nine or more compartments. Each compartment was filled with wooden rods or slats (called "tariffa" by Kircher). The compartments were organized according to the nine functions they performed (see #Topics). To use the organum, you would remove the rods you needed, manipulate them or rearrange them as needed to perform your calculation, and then return the rods to the box. Some of the rods were simple tables, as one might find in an almanac. Other rods, in particular the music, cryptography, and arithmetic rods, were more complex in design and intended to be used in combination.

== History ==
In 1661, 11 years after the publication of Musurgia Universalis, which contains a description of a similar, but more limited device, the Arca Musarithmica, Kircher sent an Organum Mathematicum to Gottfried Aloys Kinner, the tutor to the 12-year-old Charles Joseph, Archduke of Habsburg, for whom the Organum was likely intended. Kircher enclosed instructions in a drawer in the base of the device, as well as a set of mathematical instruments.

The Organum Mathematicum was later described in a 1668 book of the same title by Gaspar Schott, who was Kircher's pupil. The book includes numerous excerpts from the original manual. There is also a portrait of the young Charles Joseph who had died four years earlier. There are no surviving Organums which closely resemble the device illustrated in Schott's book, but there are three known devices, likely of Jesuit manufacture, which contain essentially the same content.

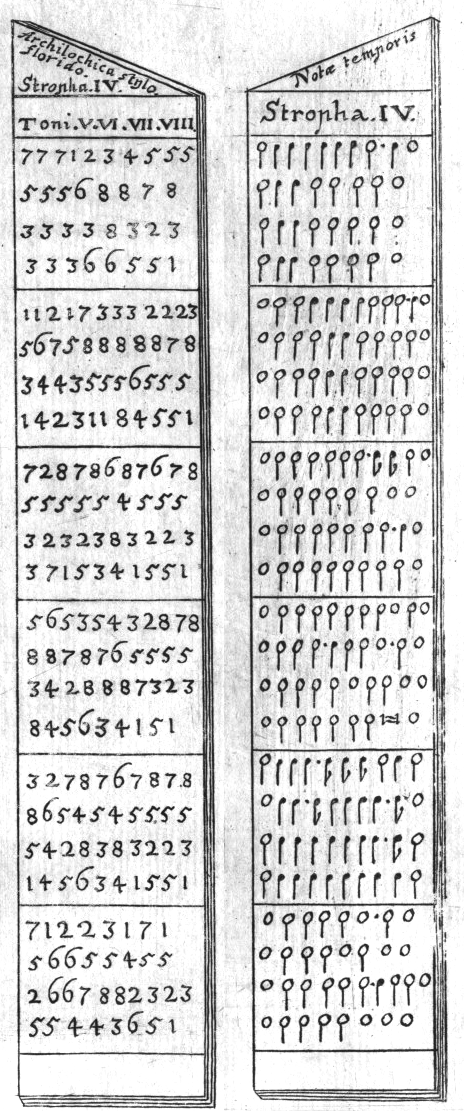
Front and back of one of Kircher's musical rods

== Topics ==
The device described in Schott's book was divided by functionality into 9 main sections, each of which contained approximately 24 rods.

=== Arithmetic ===
The arithmetic rods included a set of Napier's Bones. They were capable of assisting with the multiplication of multi-digit numbers and producing quotients.

=== Geometry ===
The rods in this section could aid in determining heights, by use of a geometric square.

=== Fortifications ===
The rods in this section could aid in determining the design of bulwarks in fortification plans.

=== Chronology ===
The rods in this section could be used to determine the date of Easter and other church holidays which were positioned relative to it. These rods simply contained a table of upcoming dates.

=== Horography ===
The rods in this section contained information needed to construct sundials.

=== Astronomy ===
This compartment had tablets which resembled those found in an almanac. For each day of the year, the length of the day and night, the times for sunrise and sunset, and the duration of morning and evening twilight were provided. All the information was based on measurements taken at 48 degrees latitude (Vienna).

=== Astrology ===
This section had tables describing movements for the visible planets, and the constellation Draco, and also provided astrological interpretations for the 12 zodiac signs.

=== Cryptography ===
The rods in this section could be used to encrypt and decrypt text using a cyclic transposition cypher, based on a keyword.

=== Music ===
The rods in this section could be used by non musicians to compose church music. The system used was the same as that used for Kircher's previous device, the Arca Musarithmica. They contained sets of musical phrases which could be combined randomly to set verses to music, producing millions of hymns in 4-part harmony.

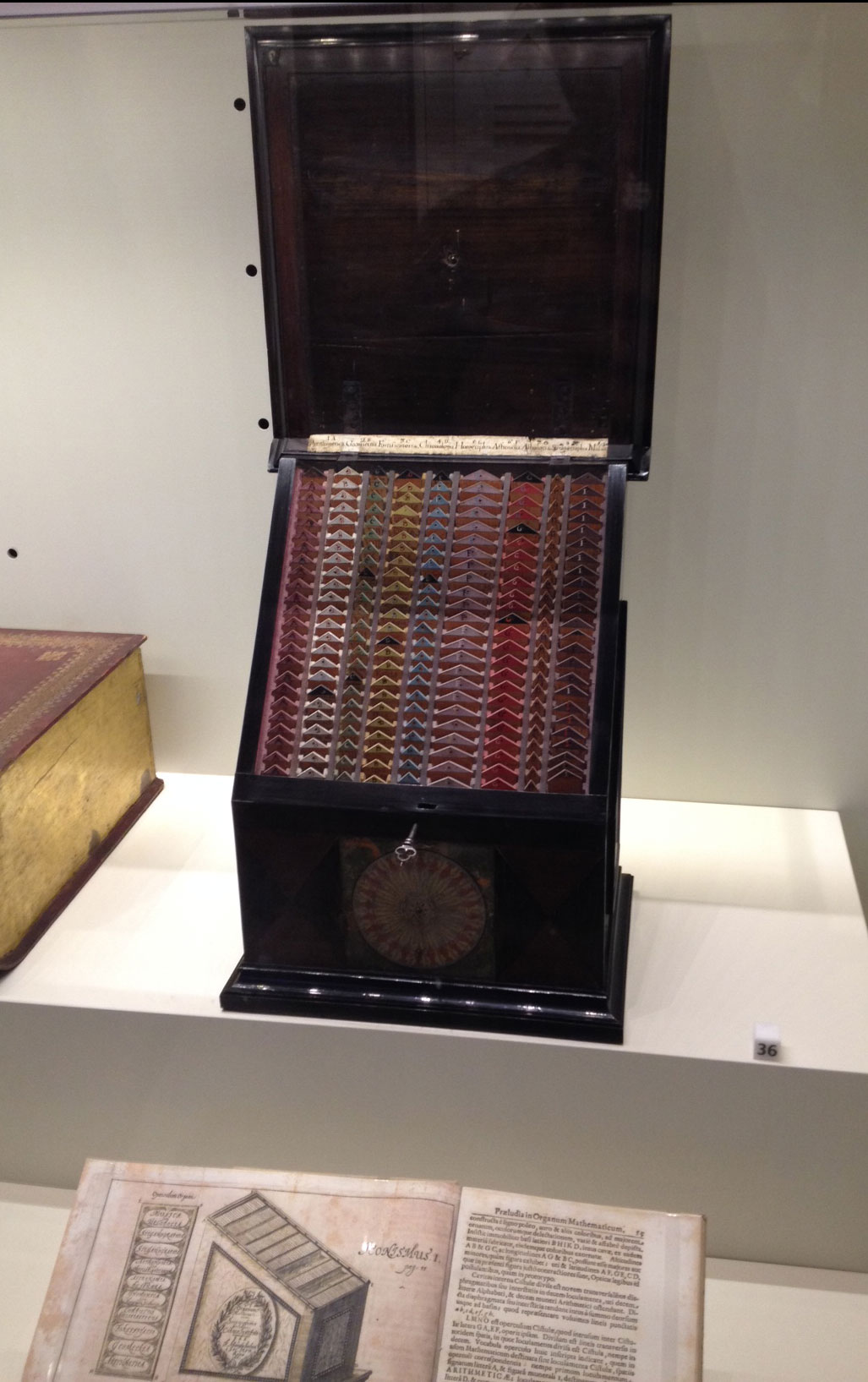
The Organum Mathematicum at the Museo Galileo in Florence

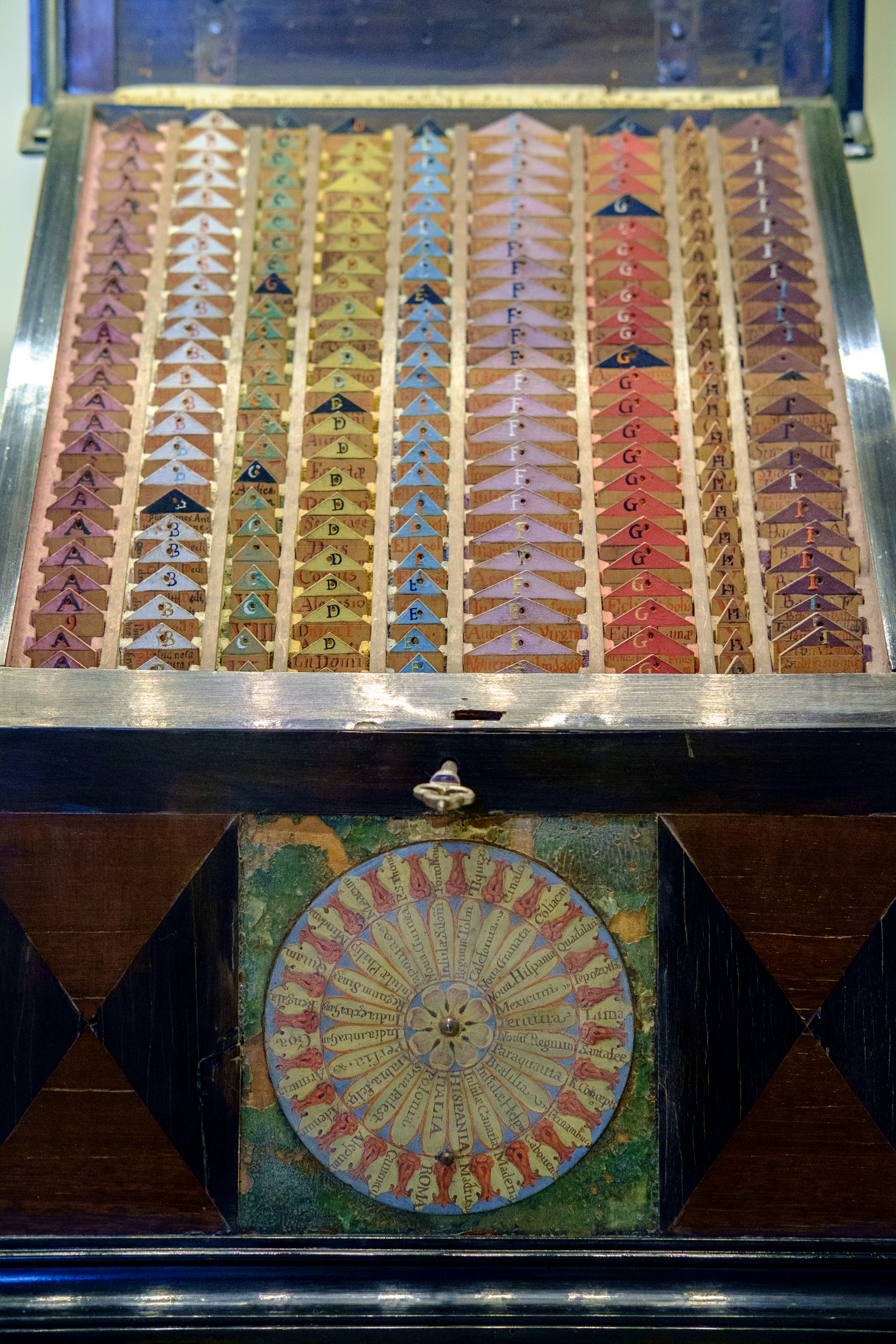
Another view of the Organum Mathematicum at the Museo Galileo in Florence, Italy.

=== Surviving models ===
There are few surviving examples of the Organum. There are no surviving Organums which closely resemble the device illustrated in Schott's book, but there are three known 17th-century devices which contain essentially the same content. Most of them appear to have been built to impress important patrons to the Jesuits. It is unclear if any of them saw regular use.

==== Florence ====
This Organum has a steep slope which presents all the rods attractively. There is a dial in the front which can be used to find local time in 24 different cities around the world (the dial duplicates an illustration from Kircher's Ars Magna Lucis et Umbra). The rods are cut to resemble obelisks, perhaps playing on Kircher's reputed expertise in Egyptology.

==== Prague ====
This Organum appears identical to the Florence model. Some photos show an additional metal frame which may have been added later for protection.

==== Munich ====
This Organum is the 'odd man out' - it is very different in appearance from the Florence and Prague devices, which are essentially identical. The chest is not sloped, and there are a lot of extra drawers on the pedestal.

=== Related devices ===
Kircher's earlier Arca Musarithmica was a music composing device of similar design to the Organum. The content of the rods was essentially the same as the musical rods in the Organum (although there was room for more of them). The Organum can be thought of as an improved and generalized version of the Arca.
