= Ars Magna =

Ars Magna may refer to:

- Ars Magna (Cardano book), a 16th-century book on algebra
- Ars Magna (Llull book), a 14th-century philosophical work
- Ars Magna Lucis et Umbrae, a 17th-century work on optics
