= Historia Eustachio Mariana =

1665 work by Athanasius Kircher

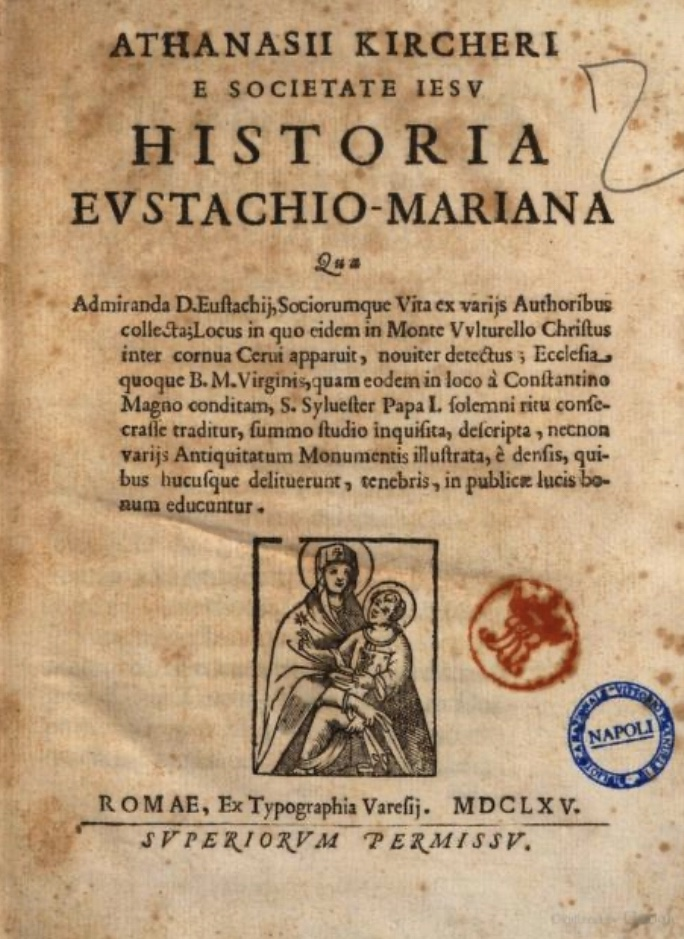
Title page of Historia Eustachio Mariana

Historia Eustachio Mariana is a 1665 work by the Jesuit scholar Athanasius Kircher. It describes his chance discovery of a ruined shrine of the Virgin Mary at Mentorella in Tivoli, the site where tradition held that the Roman martyr Saint Eustace had experienced conversion to Christianity. The book was dedicated to Giovanni Nicola, abbot of the monastery at Vulturalla, and a member of the family of the counts of Poli. It was intended to help raise funds for the restoration of the chapel, and it was Kircher's first topographical work.

Following the book's publication, Kircher secured funds from (among others) Leopold I, Holy Roman Emperor, Maximilian II Emanuel, Elector of Bavaria and Pedro Antonio de Aragón. He rebuilt and restored the chapel, while adding a set of large speaking trumpets to broadcast calls to attend Mass.

The book popularized the false claim that the shrine had been built by Constantine the Great and consecrated by Pope Sylvester I. This was largely based on Kircher's fanciful speculations.

== Background ==
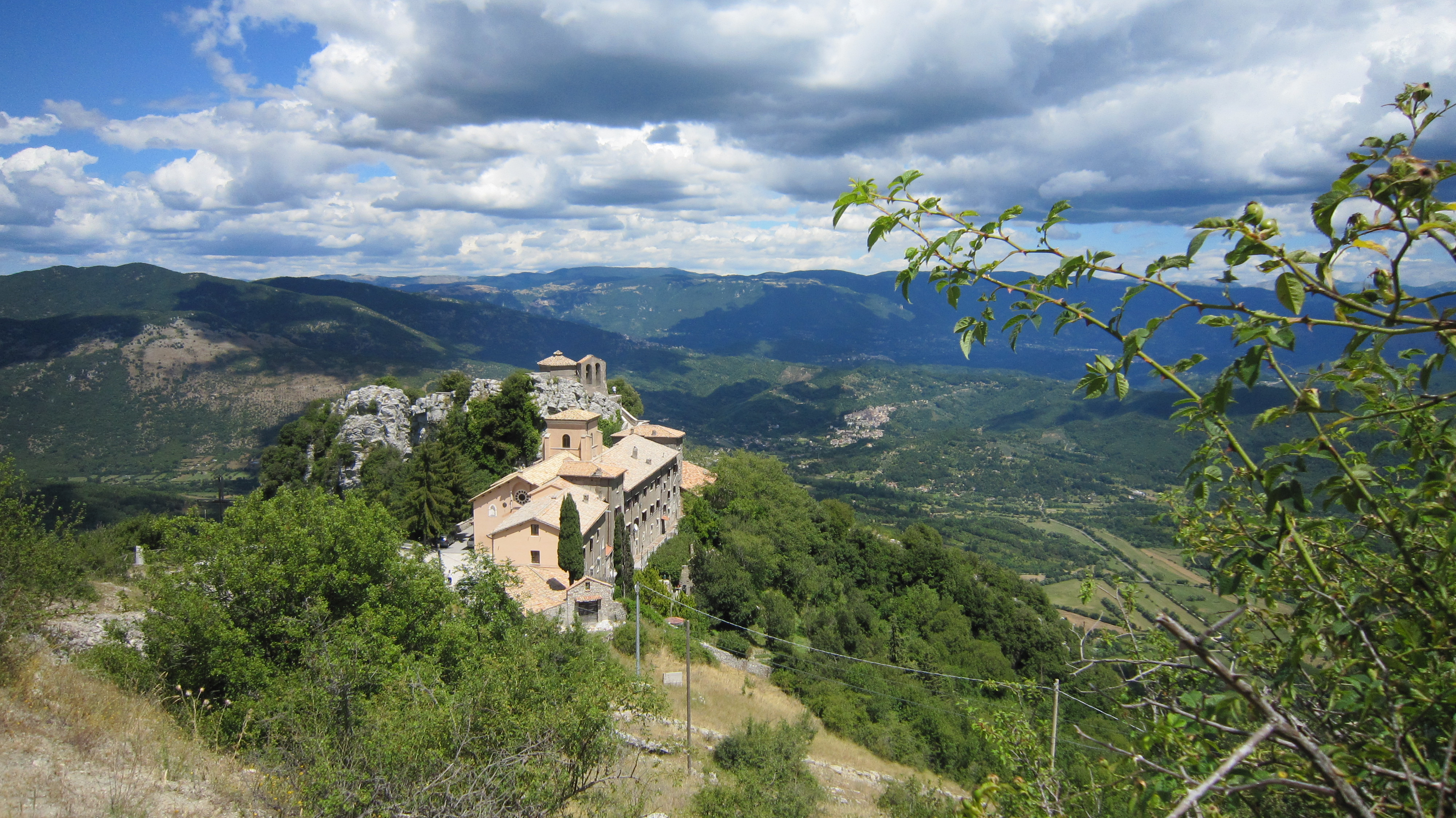
The shrine of Mentorella

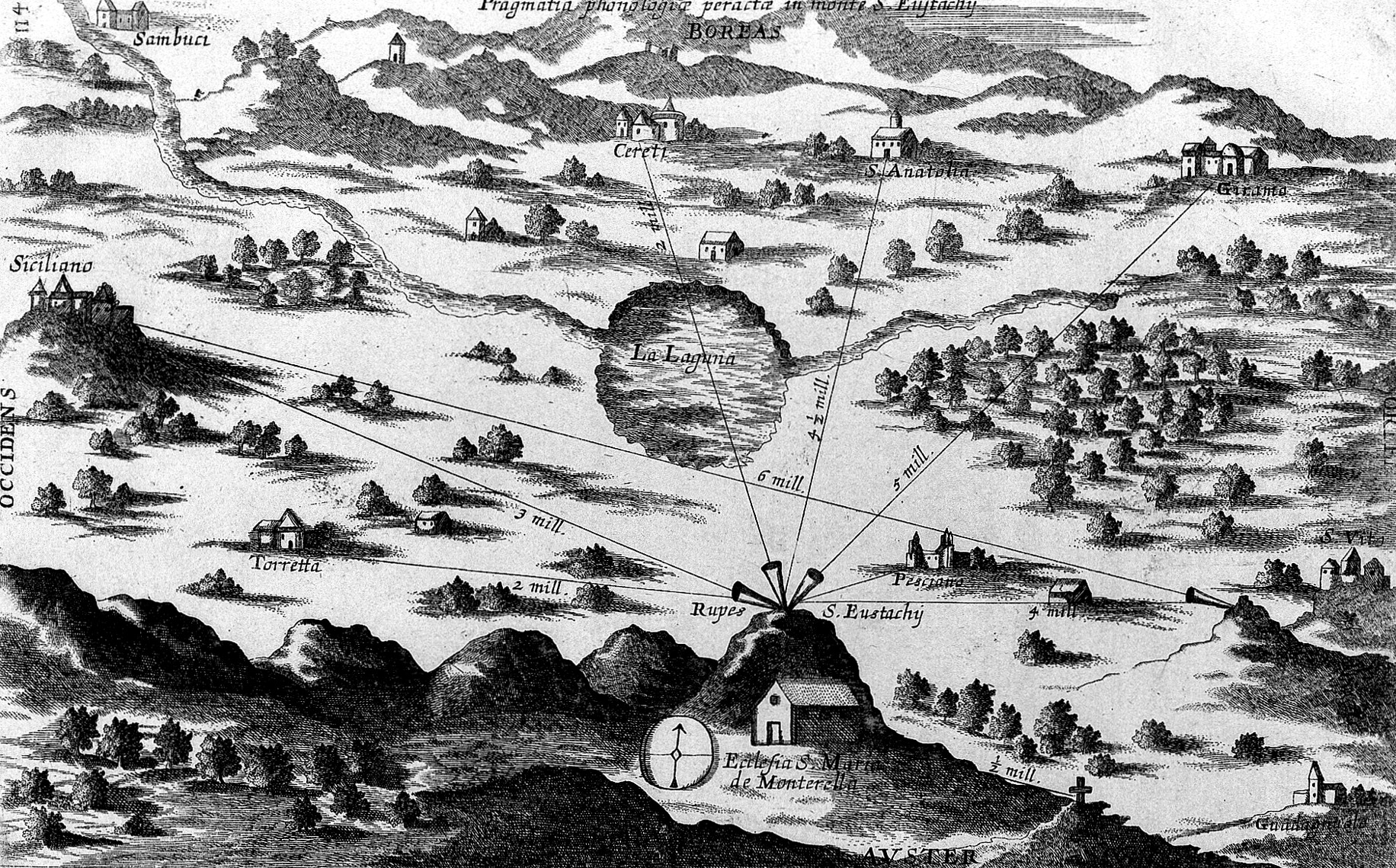
Illustration from Phonurgia Nova showing the speaking trumpets at the shrine of Mentorella

Kircher later reported how the Virgin Mary had spoken to him when he first visited Mentorella in 1661:

See how I am neglected here in this wilderness? Nobody cares about me, nobody cares about my church and this sacred place, where I was worshipped so much by people in earlier times.

Kircher vowed to ensure that her sanctuary was restored.

When I returned home I found a letter enclosed in a letter through which the most well-to-do Duke of Braunschweig-Lueneburg had granted me 400 Roman thalers to promote my studies with unusual generosity worthy of such a prince. I recognized a hidden hint from the Mother of God, put aside all other studies, and was by no means idle, but started the story of this holy place under the title: "Historia Eustachio-Mariana".

== Research, fundraising and restoration ==
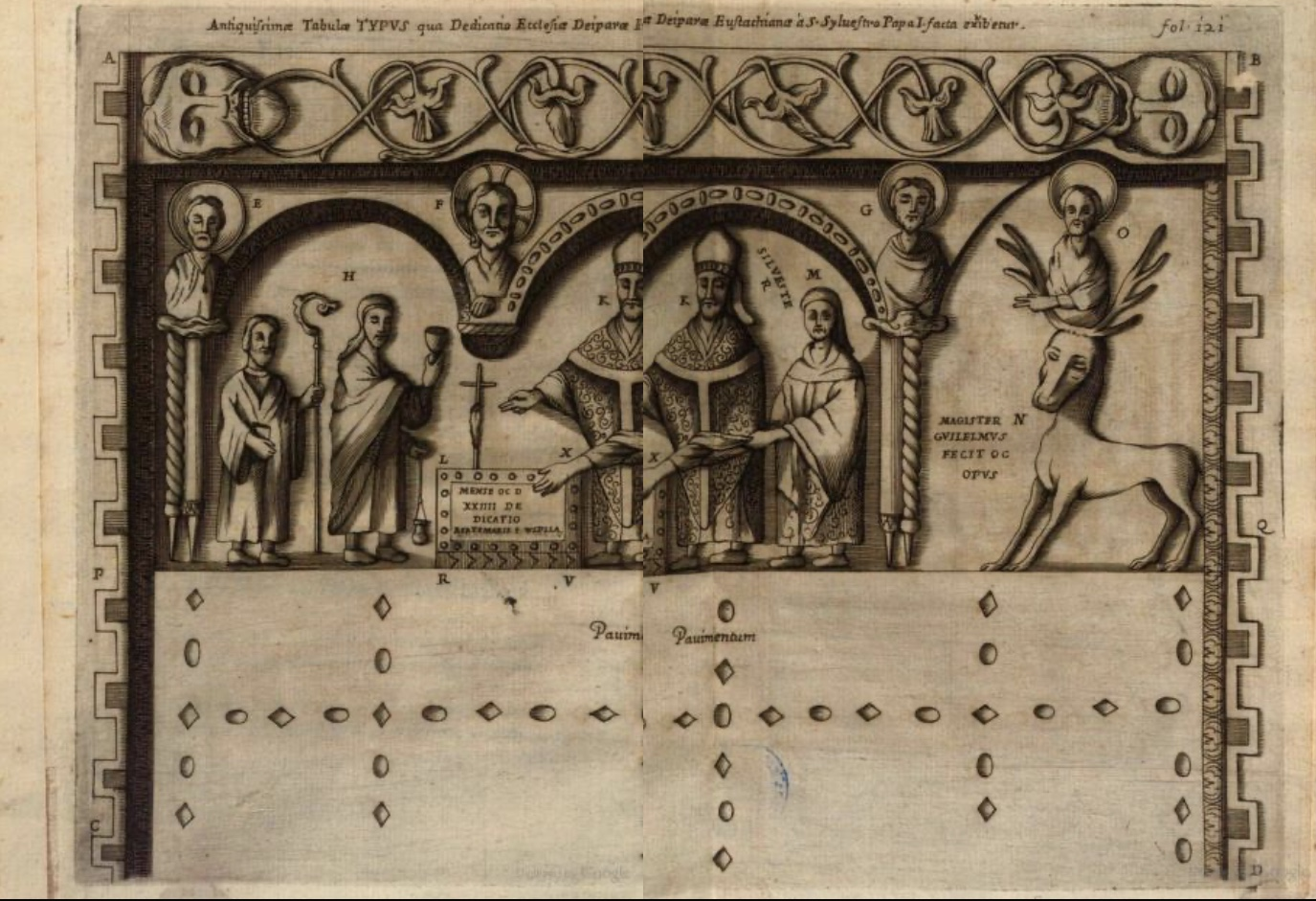
Illustration of a medieval oak panel from Historia Eustachio Mariana

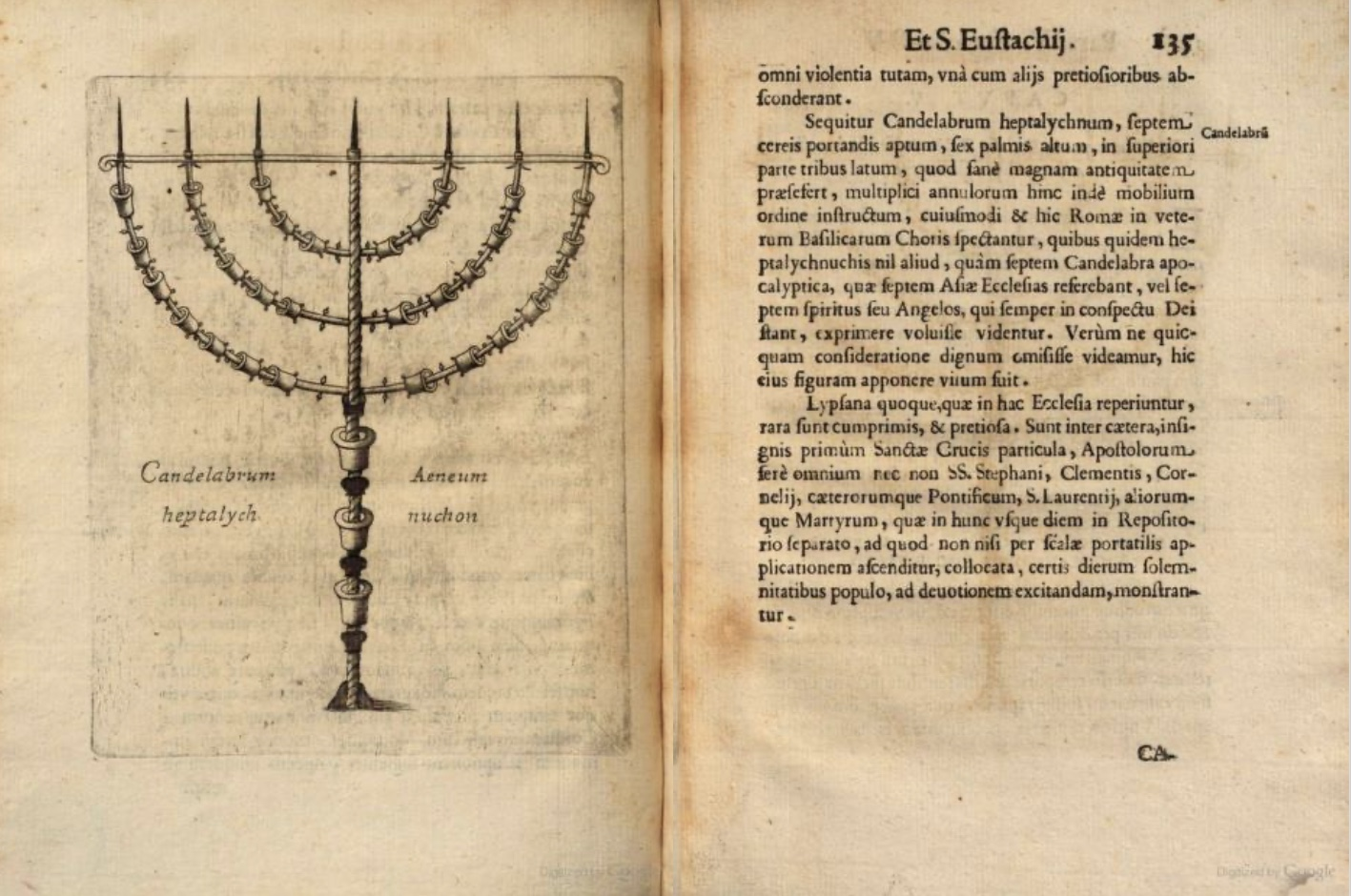
Illustration of a medieval candelabra from Historia Eustachio Mariana

Kircher began research to find the origins of the ruins he had discovered, and concluded that the shrine had been built at the time of Constantine the Great and commemorated the conversion of the Roman soldier Placidus, known to posterity as Saint Eustance. He then spent four years studying the site and its history, which culminated in a celebratory fete in 1664, followed by the publication of Historia Eustachio Mariana the following year. These donations were secured partly through Kircher's account of how the shrine had originally been built by the Emperor Constantine and consecrated by Pope Sylvester I, which had no foundation in evidence at all, and relied on Kircher's own idiosyncratic interpretation of an oak panel from the site. Overall, the claim of great age and illustrious founding for the shrine has been described as the "art historian Kircher at his most creative."

After the publication of the Historia Eustachio Mariana donations came in to fund the restoration: 1000 imperials from Emperor Leopold, 400 scudi from Johann Friedrich, Count of Wallenstein and Archbishop of Prague, 400 scudi from Maximilian II Emanuel, Elector of Bavaria and 700 scudi from Pedro Antonio de Aragón, Viceroy of Naples. Other Catholic rulers from all over Germany also contributed.

Having rebuilt and restored the chapel, Kircher added a device of his own design in the form of a set of large speaking trumpets that pointed at various villages in the valley below the shrine. These allowed the broadcast of calls to attend Mass to people several miles away. They were not described in Historia Eustachio Mariana, but were illustrated in his later work Phonurgia Nova (1673).

== Sections ==
The work is divided into five sections: (i) the story of Saint Eustace and his martyrdom (ii) the genealogy of the saint (iii) a description of the place where his conversion took place (iv) the shrine and (v) the church of Saint Eustace in Rome.

== Illustrations ==
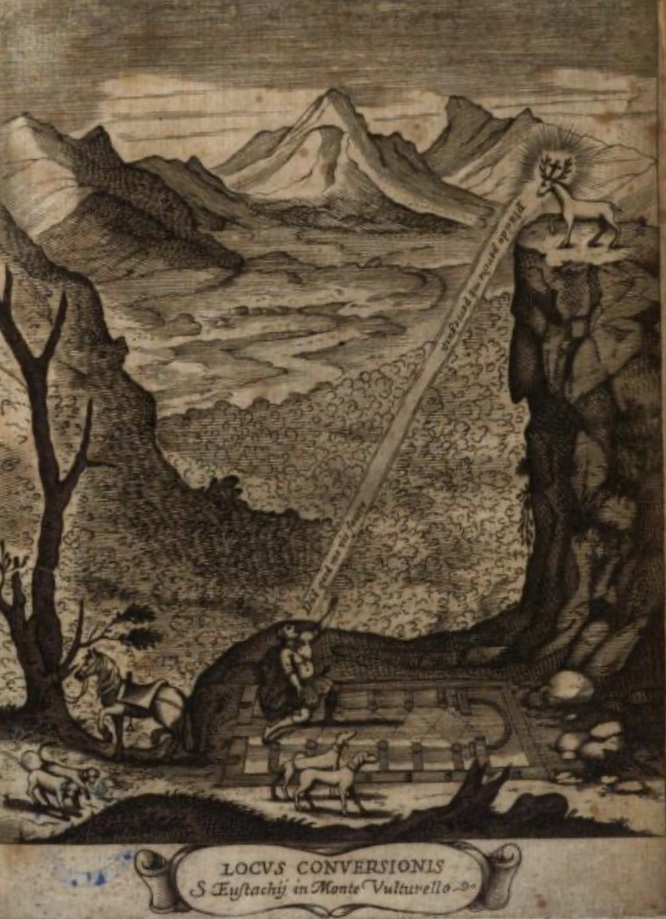
The conversion of St Eustace, illustration from Historia Eustachio Mariana

One of the plates in the book shows the moment of Saint Eustace's conversion. A stag of great size stands at the top of a cliff, where he had leaped after being chased by Placidus, who was hunting. Between the stag's horns is a vision of Christ on the cross, which inspired Placidus to become a Christian. A beam of light shines down from the vision to Placidus below, carrying the words of the stag "Placidus, why are you hunting me?". Beneath him kneels the future saint, gazing up with the words "Lord, what would you have me do?". Under his feet is a plan of the future chapel, and his horse and hunting hounds stand nearby. The scene is probably not original, as it resembles one painted inside the chapel at Mentorella, presumably from the late medieval period, which also served as the model for the fresco by Johann Paul Schor, painted inside the chapel.

The book also included illustrations of the wall-paintings he found in the ruined shrine, as well as some of the treasures that had formerly belonged to it, kept in safekeeping by the Duke of Polana in his library. These included a medieval silver cross, a large bronze candlestick, and an oak tablet carved with the legend of Saint Eustace. Kircher discussed the iconography of this tablet at some length, showing a degree of interest in medieval art which was unusual for his era.
