= Rebecca Vaughan =

Alchemist (d. 1658)

Rebecca Vaughan (c. 1633 – 17 April 1658) was an English alchemist, the research partner and wife of Thomas Vaughan. She was active during the 1650s.

Very little is known of Vaughan, except through her husband's notebook which has survived and was passed to the British Library by Hans Sloane, possibly via Walter Charleton. The notebook is decorated with a monogram combining the couple's initials, T., R., and V., which Thomas began using after her sudden death in 1658. The title page of the notebook is marked "Ex libris Thomas et Rebecca Vaughan, 1651, Sept. 28", indicating that they were equal partners in their research. He records her significant role in discovering aqua vitae and another distillate they called aqua rebecca. In one entry, her husband declares: "I dis-covered all this in the days of my dearest Wife, about whom I can say, what Solomon said about his wisdom: all good things came to me in like manner through her".

No birth or marriage records survive for Vaughan—in part due to the Interregnum and the Great Fire of London—frustrating efforts to learn more of her early life. Scholars agree that Vaughan was probably born in Meppershall, Bedfordshire, as her corpse was transported from London to be buried in that village. In 1998, Donald R. Dickson posited that Vaughan was likely one of the eleven children of Timothy Archer (1597–1672), the village's rector, and his wife Rebekah (née Beedelles). If this is correct, then Vaughan was probably born in 1633, or possibly 1636/1637.

Rebecca and Thomas Vaughan were married in London on 28 September 1651. She died in London on 17 April 1658 and was buried at Meppershall nine days later.

In 2026, German artist Anselm Kiefer included a painting of Vaughan in his collection, The Women Alchemists, which was displayed in Milan's Sala delle Cariatidi as part of the cultural showcase of the 2026 Winter Olympics.
