= Norman Cooley =

English cricketer and footballer

Personal information
- Full name: Norman Sidney Cooley
- Born: 16 January 1941; Meppershall, Bedfordshire
- Died: 9 February 2024 (aged 83); Kempston, Bedfordshire
- Batting: Right-handed
- Role: Wicket-keeper

Domestic team information
- Years: Team
- 1962–1975: Bedfordshire

Career statistics
Competition	List A
Matches	5
Runs scored	58
Batting average	14.50
100s/50s	0/0
Top score	20*
Catches/stumpings	2/–
- Source: Cricinfo, 10 August 2011

Norman Sidney Cooley (16 January 1941 – 9 February 2024) was an English cricketer and footballer. Cooley was a right-handed batsman who fielded as a wicket-keeper. He was born in Meppershall, Bedfordshire.

Cooley made his debut for Bedfordshire against Hertfordshire in the 1962 Minor Counties Championship. He played Minor counties cricket for Bedfordshire from 1962 to 1975, making 59 Minor Counties Championship appearances. In 1964, he scored centuries in both innings of a match against Lincolnshire becoming the first Bedfordshire player to achieve the feat in Minor counties cricket. He made his List A debut against Northamptonshire in the 1972 Gillette Cup. He made four further List A appearances, the last of which came against Lancashire in the 1973 Gillette Cup. In his five List A matches, he scored 58 runs at an average of 14.50, with a high score of 20 not out.

Cooley had another string to his bow, as one of the few to have successfully combined a cricketing with a footballing career. He played 738 games for Bedford Town F.C. in the Southern League between 1960 and 1977, scoring a career total of 73 goals, and later served as the club's youth coach and groundsman. He also worked as head groundsman at Bedford School between 1975 and 2000. His brother John played rugby union for Northampton, Bedford and East Midlands.

Cooley died on 9 February 2024 at the age of 83.
