= Nathanael Salmon =

English antiquary

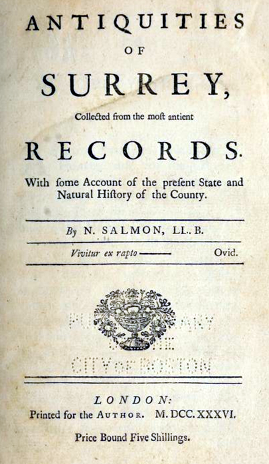
Title page of Antiquities of Surrey, 1736.

Nathanael (or Nathaniel) Salmon (22 March 1675 – 2 April 1742) was an English antiquary who wrote books on Roman and other antiquities to be found in the south-east of England. He was not well respected as a scholar in his time or subsequently, but he was industrious and well travelled, and he recorded many local customs and much folklore.

== Early life ==
Nathanael Salmon was born on 22 March 1675 at Meppershall Rectory, Bedfordshire, the eldest son of Thomas Salmon, the Rector, and his wife Katherine Bradshaw. He was educated at Corpus Christi College, Cambridge (LLB, 1695).

== Career ==
Salmon was ordained a priest in 1699, but refused to swear allegiance to Queen Anne in 1702 and thereby reject the son of King James II. He resigned as a curate and worked for a time as a physician. He rejected the offer of a parish in Suffolk, although it paid a stipend of £140 a year.

Salmon wrote a number of books on local history, collecting folklore and detailing local customs, and he "could turn a pungent phrase." He travelled extensively in England, carefully observing landscape and recording what he was told of the folklore, as well as current life and conditions. His histories are considered inaccurate, but he usefully published much manuscript material.

== Death ==
Salmon died in London on 2 April 1742, leaving three daughters. He was buried at St Dunstan in the West, London 5 April 1742.

== Works ==
- The History of Hertfordshire, describing the county and its ancient monuments, particularly the Roman, Richardson, London, 1728.
- A New Survey of England, wherein the Defects of Camden are supplied &c, 11 parts, 1728–1729.
- The Lives of the English Bishops from the Restauration to the Revolution, 1731–1733.
- Antiquities of Surrey, collected from the most ancient records, London, 1736.
- The History and Antiquities of Essex, 1740.

== See also ==
- Henry Chauncy
