= Thomas Salmon (musicologist) =

English cleric & writer (1648–1706)

Thomas Salmon (1648–1706) was an English cleric and writer on music.

== Life ==
Thomas Salmon was the son of Thomas Salmon of Hackney. He entered Trinity College, Oxford, on 8 April 1664, and graduated B.A. 1667, and M.A. 1670. At the university, he mainly studied mathematics; Matthew Locke says that Salmon applied to him for instruction in musical composition. Locke disclaimed competence, referring Salmon to the Compendium of Practical Musick by Christopher Simpson, and suggested John Birchensha as a teacher.

In 1673 Salmon obtained the living of Meppershall in Bedfordshire, He was also rector of the Church of St Katherine in Ickleford, Hertfordshire.

Salmon gave, in July 1705, a lecture to the Royal Society on just intonation with illustrative performances by the brothers Frederick and Christian Steffkin, on viols, and Gasperini. On 4 December, he wrote to Sir Hans Sloane concerning Greek enharmonic music. Further correspondence sought a patron for musical experimentation.

Salmon died at Meppershall, and was buried in the church on 1 August 1706.

== Works ==
Salmon in 1672 published an Essay to the Advancement of Musick proposing the disuse of the Guidonian hand and its nomenclature, and the substitution of the plain first seven letters of the alphabet. Salmon proposed the modern octave system, which William Bathe had already recommended. Salmon also added a proposal to give up the tablature then used for the lute, and in all music to substitute for the clefs the letters B, M, T (bass, mean, treble), each stave having G on the lowest line.

There followed an acrimonous controversy. Salmon appealed to Locke and the lutenist, Theodore Steffkins, for support; Locke answered by publishing Observations upon a late Essay, in which Salmon's proposals are attacked. Salmon retorted in a Vindication; with this was printed a tract by an unidentified "N. E.", dated from Norwich. Locke's answer, The Present Practice of Music Vindicated, supported by tracts by John Phillips and John Playford. The dismissive treatment of Salmon resorted to obscenity. Salmon in 1688 issued a work on temperament, entitled A Proposal to perform Music in Perfect and Mathematical Proportions, to which John Wallis contributed.

Salmon's other publications were:

- In 1701, advocacy in favour of education and universal parochial schools.
- A New Historical Account of St. George for England; and the Origin of the Most Noble Order of the Garter (1704); against Peter Heylyn.
- Historical Collections of Great Britain (1706).

== Family ==
Salmon married Katherine, daughter of John Bradshaw the regicide; Nathanael Salmon and Thomas Salmon were their sons.

== Notes ==
Attribution

This article incorporates text from a publication now in the public domain: Lee, Sidney, ed. (1897). "Salmon, Thomas (1648-1706)". Dictionary of National Biography. Vol. 50. London: Smith, Elder & Co.
