= Meppershall =

Coordinates: 52.017°N 0.340°W

- Village
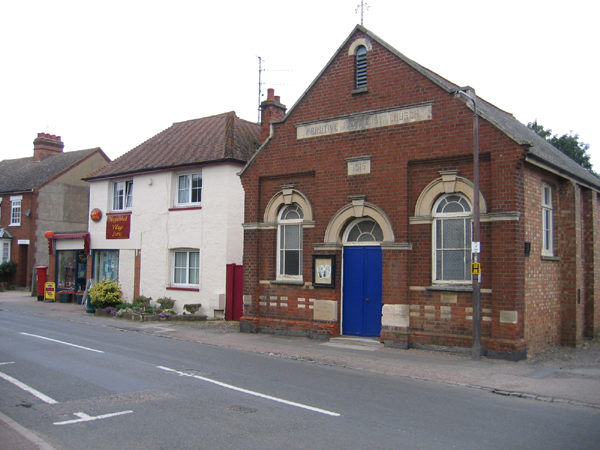
- Meppershall High Street

- Location within Bedfordshire
- Population: 2,044; 1,745 (2011 Census) https://centralbedfordshire.communityinsight.org/map/?subregion=18599&indicator=census11_p04_all_20210101#
- OS grid reference: TL140366
- Unitary authority: Central Bedfordshire
- Ceremonial county: Bedfordshire
- Region: East
- Country: England
- Sovereign state: United Kingdom
- Post town: Shefford
- Postcode district: SG17
- Dialling code: 01462
- Police: Bedfordshire
- Fire: Bedfordshire
- Ambulance: East of England
- UK Parliament: Hitchin

Meppershall is a hilltop village in Bedfordshire near Shefford, Campton, Shillington, Stondon and surrounded by farmland.

== History ==
The village and the manor house are mentioned in the Domesday Book in 1086 - with the entry reading: Malpertesselle/Maperteshale: Gilbert FitzSolomon.

The Manor House belonged to the De Meppershall family for nearly 300 years following 1086. The present house is early 17th century.

Until 1844 Meppershall was partially in Hertfordshire. The detached portion of Hertfordshire was transferred to Bedfordshire in 1844, following the Counties (Detached Parts) Act 1844.

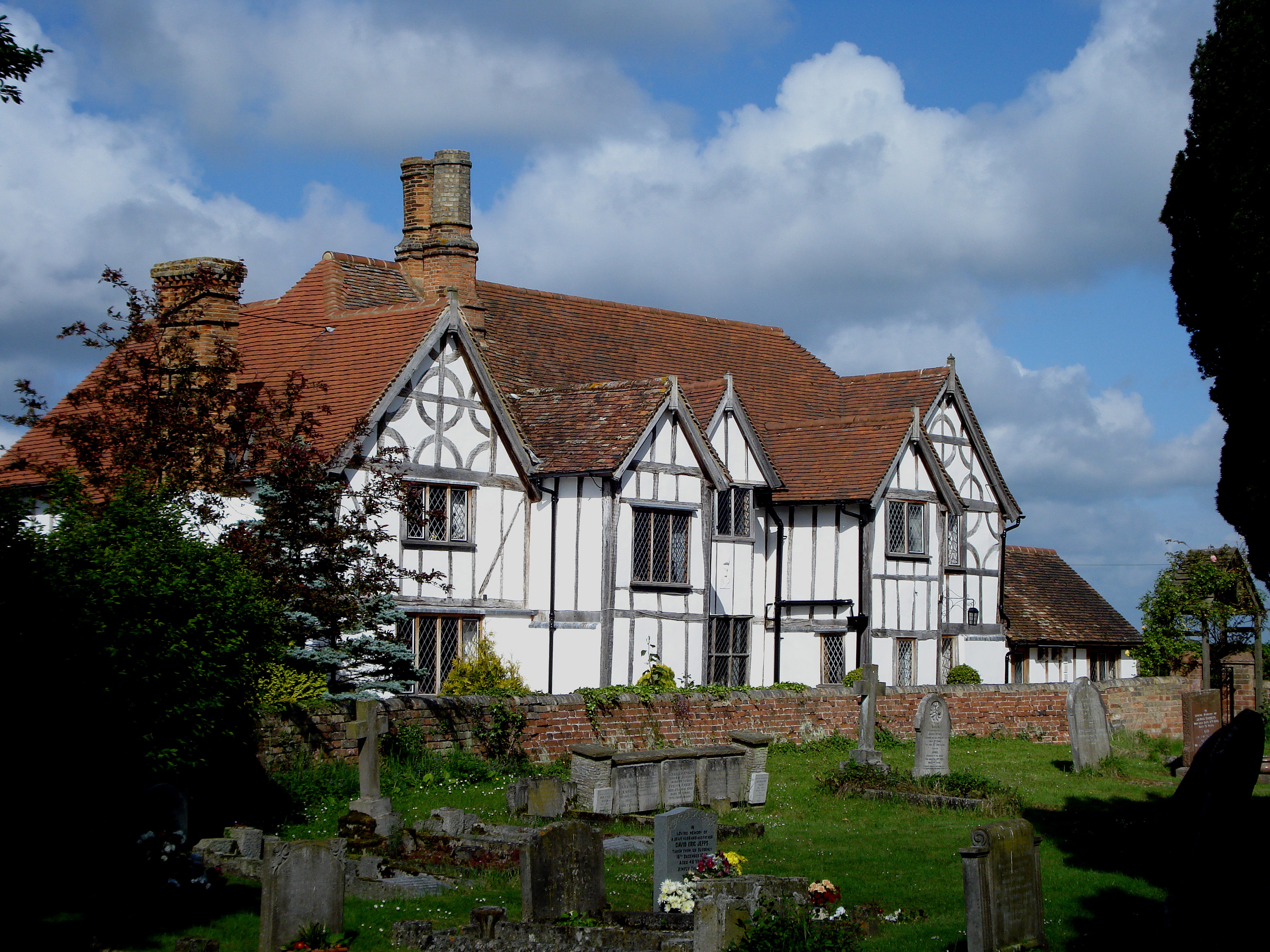
Meppershall Manor House

St. Mary's church dates back to the Normans. The Parish Records of St Mary, Meppershall, have been published on CD by the Parochial Church Council.

== Economy ==
Before the advent of greenhouses, Meppershall was a poor community with large families living in two up, two down type thatched cottages built of brick with stone floors. However, so many greenhouses were built in the village that it was known as a "glass city," growing salad crops for local markets, which were shipped further afield via the railway.

As well as farming, the village earned its income from coprolite digging. Coprolite is the fossilised dung of pre-historic creatures, which when ground and treated with sulphuric acid produces a superphosphate fertiliser. To extract it, a long trench was dug on one side of a field. The overlaying clay was then dug out until the nodule bed was reached. If the depth of clay to be removed was more than eight to nine feet, the trench was made in two or three steps, and as the nodules were taken out, so the trench was refilled with the earth already removed. The nodule bed was shovelled into barrows and taken to the washing mill. This consisted of a circular iron trough with a pivot in the centre to which a set of travelling rakes was attached, these being dragged round by horses, and a constant stream of water was kept running through the trough until the clay washed off. The dirty water then was drained off and the nodules carted away. The coprolite was worth about £3 a ton in 1890, yielding some 300 tons per acre. A good fossil digger could earn as much as £2 a week. This industry has also died out.

== Facilities ==
There is a Budgens in the center of the village, which contains a post office. In terms of food amenities, there is one public house (Sugar Loaf) along with a historic local bakery.

The village also contains St Mary's Church, which has served the village for about 900 years.

A newly built Village Hall, after the previous village hall was demolished to make access for new housing development, provides spaces for hire and regular activities such as martial arts and drama groups. The village hall also contains a social club and bar.

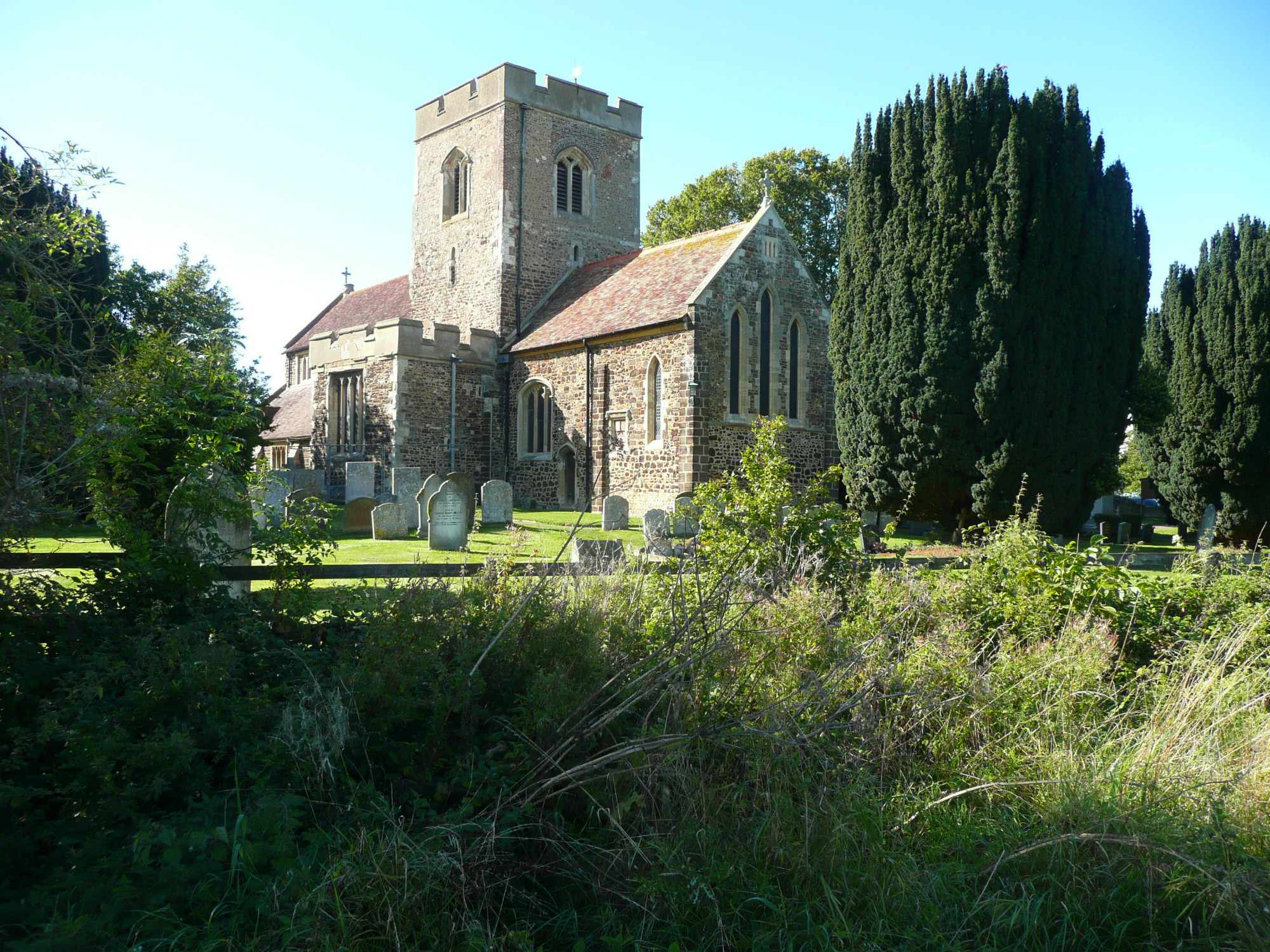
St Mary's Church, Meppershall

== Transport ==
There are bus routes which regularly run through the village.

The nearest train station is Arlesey, which has regular trains to surrounding towns and London

== Education ==
In the village there is a preschool and a lower school.

The nearest middle school are Robert Bloomfield Academy (Years 5 to 8) and Henlow Academy (Years 5-11).

It is in the catchment zone for Samuel Whitbread Academy, which has an upper school and sixth form.

== Notable people ==
- Norman Cooley (1941–2024), cricketer and footballer
- Nathanael Salmon (1675–1742), antiquary
- Thomas Salmon (1648–1706), cleric and musicologist
- Thomas Salmon (1679–1767), historical and geographical writer
- Rebecca Vaughan (c. 1633 – 1658), alchemist
