= John Birchensha =

John Birchensha (c.1605–1681) (sometimes spelled Birkenshaw or Berkenshaw) was an English Baroque music theorist. He presented at the Royal Society and made an impression on its members in the 1660s and 1670s.

Birchensha invented a system that he claimed would enable non-musicians to learn to compose in a short time by means of "a few easy, certain, and perfect Rules". This was at a time when other music theorists were codifying the rules of counterpoint, and writing about other rule-based and combinatorial systems to aid in the composition of music, such as the Arca Musarithmica of Athanasius Kircher. Information about his life and work remains scanty.

== Early life ==
John was born about 1605, the son of Ralph Birchensha, Comptroller of the Crown's Cheques and Musters, and his second wife Elizabeth Warburton. Ralph was based in Ireland at the time of John's birth, having served in Berwick upon Tweed and The Low Countries, and died in 1622. John was serving in the household of George FitzGerald, 16th Earl of Kildare, up to the Irish Rebellion of 1641. In the 1650s, he was known as a viol teacher in London.

== Pupils ==
Birchensha's pupils included Silas Taylor, Thomas Salmon, and most famously Samuel Pepys. Pepys recorded impressions of his sessions with Birchensha (and hints at an eventual disillusionment with his teacher) in 1662.

== Works ==
Birchensha's great aim was to publish a treatise on music in its philosophical, mathematical and practical aspects (which would have included a definitive summary of his rules of composition), entitled Syntagma musicæ. It was due to be published by March 1675. A summary was read to the Royal Society in 1676, but it never appeared, and no final manuscript of it survives. A manuscript for Robert Boyle, a relative by marriage of the Earl of Kildare, remains as the major source for his ideas on music.

In recent years, some manuscripts have been discovered which provide a more complete picture of Birchensha's theories. A book of his writings (with a biography and copious analysis) was published in 2010.
