= Johann Paul Schor =

Austrian artist

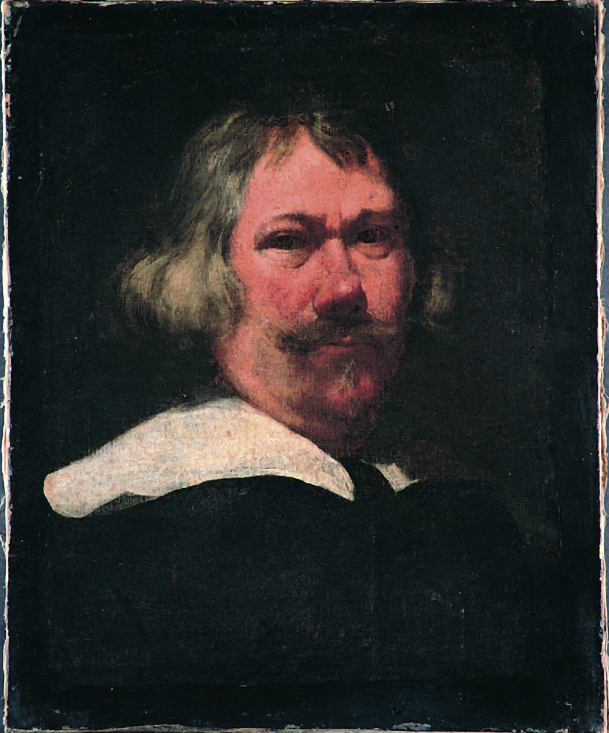

Johann Paul Schor (1615 – 1674), known in Rome as Giovanni Paolo Tedesco ([teˈdɛsko] Tedesco literally means German in Italian), was an Austrian artist. He was the preeminent designer of decorative arts in Baroque Rome, providing drawings for state beds, fireworks, coaches, silver, textiles and even banquet setpieces executed in sugar. His numerous drawings have often been attributed in the past to Bernini.

== Biography ==
Born in Innsbruck, he was a member of an extended Tyrolese artistic family, who received his training in the active studio of his father, Hans Schor. In 1640 he established himself in Rome. There, in 1654, he became a member of the Accademia di San Luca, the artists' academy.

Influenced by Bernini and Pietro da Cortona, the originality of his designs and his versatility gained him a prominent position among artists, patrons and craftsmen in Rome: "he united in his work the highly expressive artistic legacies of Cortona and Bernini with a calligraphic freedom, apparently stemming from Callot and Stefano della Bella, which at times seems to foreshadow the rococo" (Hibbard 1958:205.) Under Cortona he helped decorate the Palazzo del Quirinale for Pope Alexander VII Chigi. In 1659, the pope also commissioned Schor to execute Bernini's designs for rebuilding of the Chigi family chapel (Capella della Madonna del Voto in the Duomo di Siena. In Rome, Schor assisted Bernini, in the gilt-bronze encasing of the Chair of Saint Peter (Lanciani 1892), and other projects in the late 1650s and 1660s. (Hibbar 1958:205 note 10). Perhaps his most prominent undertaking was the baldacchino in Santo Spirito in Sassia.

Schor also helped decorate rooms of the Vatican and in Palazzo Borghese, where he collaborated with Carlo Rainaldi on the fountain for the nymphaeum in the courtyard, depicting Venus at the Bath. He supplied illusionistic quadratura suggesting sculptural enframements for ceilings at Palazzo Colonna, (1665-1668), where the painted subjects were provided by Giovanni Coli and Filippo Gherardi.

Limitations as a graphic artist might be suggested by the frontispiece that he provided for Athanasius Kircher's Musurgia Universalis, 1650, but there, doubtless the composition was overloaded by the allegorical program provided by Kircher himself. When working on his own, his surviving drawings show more proficiency.

In his workshop during the 1670s he employed a young Austrian draughtsman named Johann Bernhard Fischer, who returned to Vienna and a career in which he was ennobled as Fischer von Erlach, the pre-eminent Viennese practitioner of High Baroque architecture.

Johann Paul Schor died at Rome in 1674.

Schor's sons Filippo Schor (born Rome, 1646) and Cristoforo Schor (born Rome, 1655; died Rome, 1701) were architects and continued their father's studio after his death. Both of them were among the Roman artisans taken to Naples by the new viceroy, Gaspar Méndez de Haro, 7th Marquis of Carpio, in 1683. Del Carpio himself had met all these artists through prince Lorenzo Onofrio Colonna, grand constable of Naples, while del Carpio was Spanish ambassador to the Holy See. In 1690 Cristoforo Schor made minor modifications to Martino Longhi's facade of Sant'Antonio dei Portoghesi.

Johann Ferdinand Schor was a studio assistant of Carlo Maratta.
