= Magnes sive de Arte Magnetica =

1641 work by Athanasius Kircher

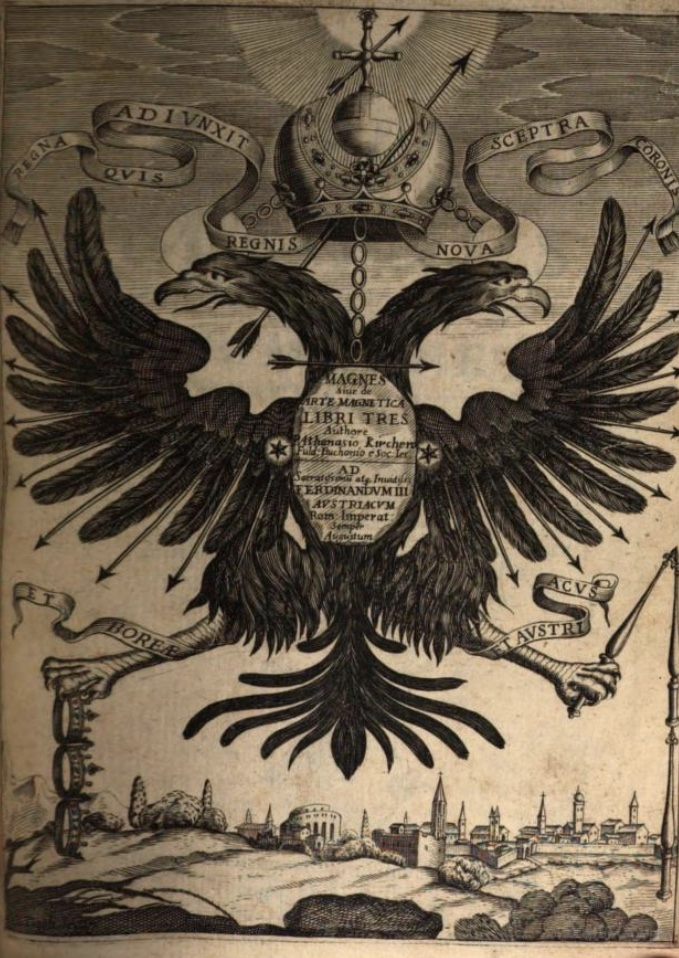
Frontispiece of the first edition of “ Magnes sive de arte magnetica”

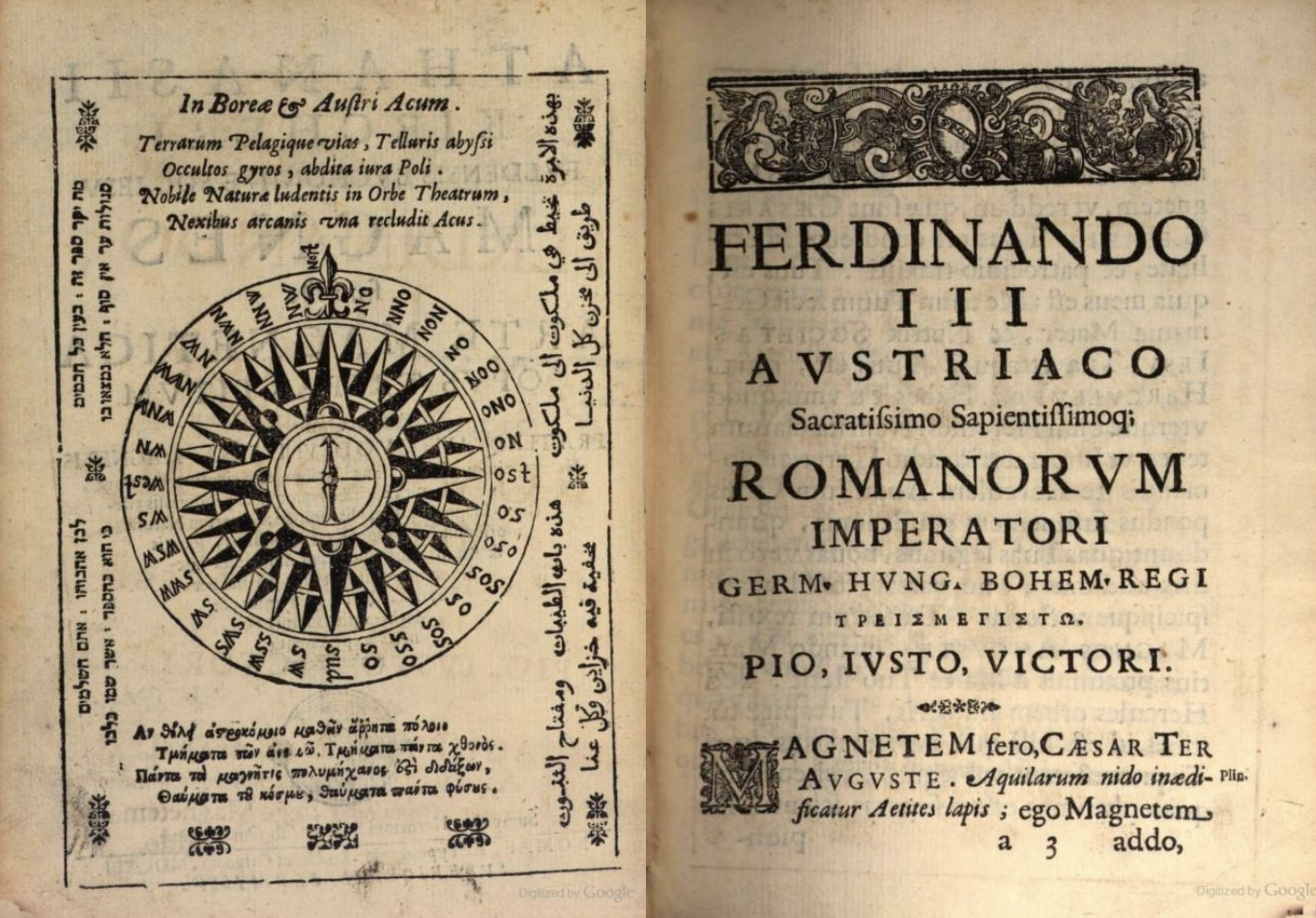
Dedication page of “ Magnes sive de arte magnetica”

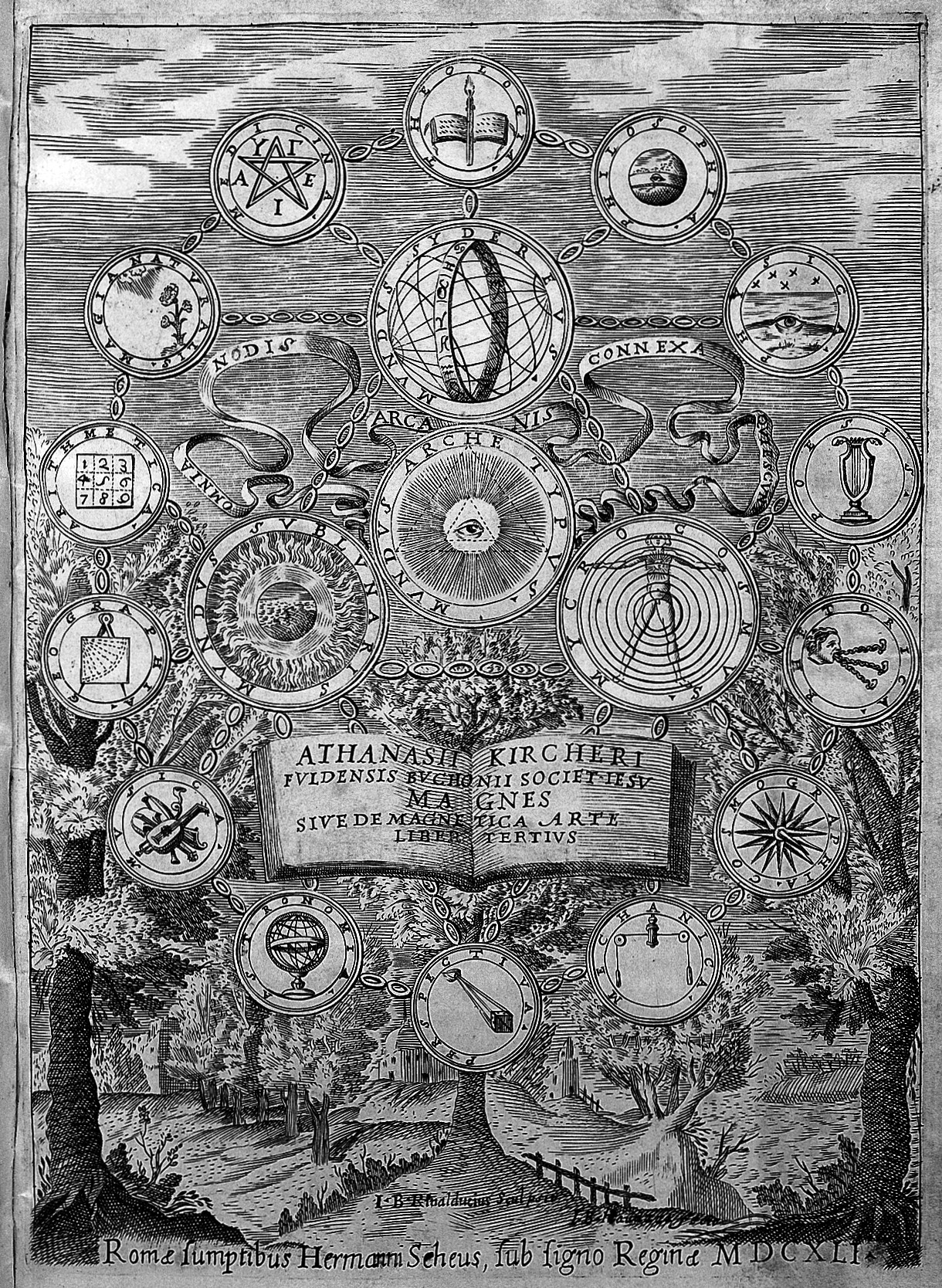
Frontispiece to Book III from the first edition of Magnes sive de arte magnetica

Magnes sive de Arte Magnetica ("The Lodestone, or the Magnetic Art") is a 1641 work by the Jesuit scholar Athanasius Kircher. It was dedicated to Emperor Ferdinand III and printed in Rome by Hermann Scheuss. It developed the ideas set out in his earlier Ars Magnesia and argued that the universe is governed by universal physical forces of attraction and repulsion. These were, as described in the motto in the book's first illustration, 'hidden nodes' of connection. The force that drew things together in the physical world was, he argued, the same force that drew people's souls towards God. The work is divided into three books: 1.De natura et facultatibus magnetis (Of the nature and properties of magnets), 2.Magnes applicatus (Applications of magnets), 3.Mundus sive catena magnetica (The world or the magnetic chain). It is noted for the first use of the term 'electromagnetism'.

== The Earth’s magnetic field ==
The question of the Earth's magnetic field and, in particular, magnetic declination was addressed in Book 2 of Magnes. It was one of great interest in Kircher's time, because it was thought that an understanding of it would help resolve the problem of longitude. The Jesuit order had scholars working in many different parts of the world and was thus able to collect observations on declination. Kircher collected forty-three of these and combined them with observations from a network of other scholars including Mersenne to produce three tables and two lists with a total of 518 values. He proposed that a magnetic map of the Earth could be made with this data, although he did not attempt to do this himself.

== Magnetism and Copernican theory ==
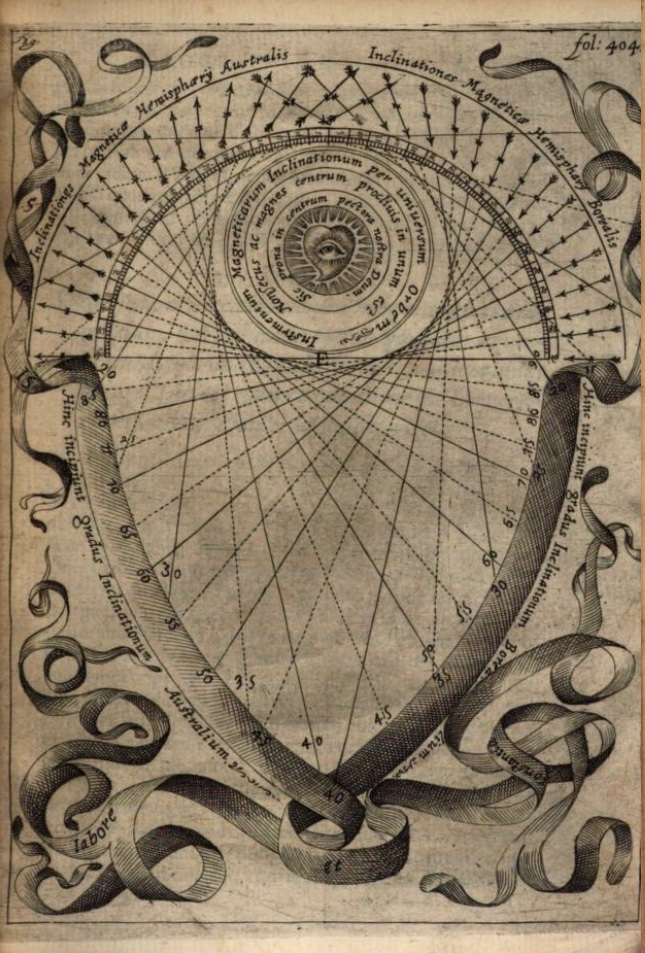
Diagram of the Earth's magnetic declination from “ Magnes sive de arte magnetica”

Magnes contained the first response by a Jesuit to the arguments of some heliocentrists who held that magnetism proved the Copernican model of the universe. Kircher was aware that he was the first scholar to mount a critical assault on the heliocentric theory that the Church had condemned as heretical. He did not agree with Galileo and some other scientists of the time that the Earth rotated, so William Gilbert's view that the Earth's magnetic poles had something to do with that rotation was one he did not support. In Kircher's view, the Earth's poles were not the axis of planetary rotation, but the axis around which the stars rotated in the heavenly spheres. Indeed, he argued in Magnes that the Earth stands still because its two magnetic poles are attracted by two celestial reverse poles. Kircher also rejected Kepler's view that the Sun created a magnetic force that caused the planets to rotate around it. He argued that the experimental proofs of magnetism were not sufficient to resolve the question of whether the Earth or the Sun was at the centre of the universe, and did not believe that the behaviour of magnets at a small scale on Earth was a useful guide to how the cosmos worked.

To disprove the idea put forward by Gilbert that the entire Earth was a magnet, Kircher attempted to calculate the force it would exert and the weight it could move if it were so. He concluded that if the Earth were a magnet and the Moon ferrous, the Earth's magnetic force would cause the Moon to crash into it. He likewise argued that if the Earth were a magnet then all the iron on its surface, even in mountains, would be pulled into itself and could not remain where anyone could find it. Kepler had argued that the Sun was like a magnet, holding the planets in their orbits around it. Kircher found this unsatisfactory: how could a single, consistent magnetic force emanating from the Sun explain the different motions of the planets, with their varying speeds and trajectories? How could a force powerful enough to move the planets leave the fixed stars beyond them unmoved? In any case, he argued, it was contrary to the observable behaviour of magnets to suggest that a motionless magnet could draw magnetised bodies around it in orbit.

== Magnetic communication ==
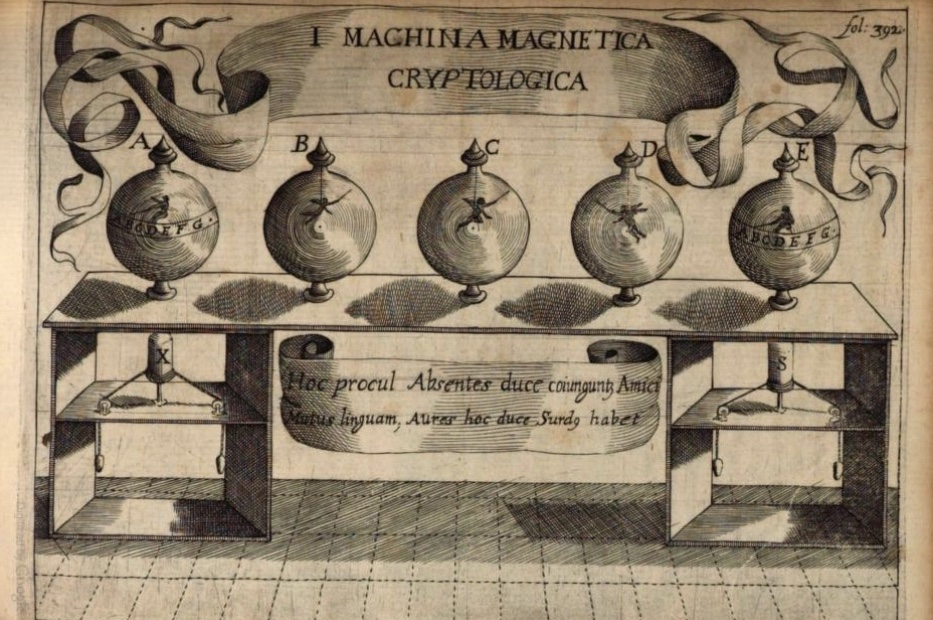
Illustration of a magnetic cryptography machine from “ Magnes sive de arte magnetica”

Kircher noted that once objects had been magnetised, they continued to have a relationship with each other even when they were at a distance. He therefore proposed a “machina cryptologica”; this consisted of a number of bottles at some distance from each other, with the letters of the alphabet inscribed around the middle of each bottle. Each also had a lubricated and magnetised stopper bearing a pointer. When the stopper on one bottle is rotated so that the pointer indicates a particular letter of the alphabet, the stopper on the other bottles rotates in the same way. Thus by turning the stopper in one place, someone could send a message to a person observing the bottle at the other end of the machine.

== Magnetism and health ==
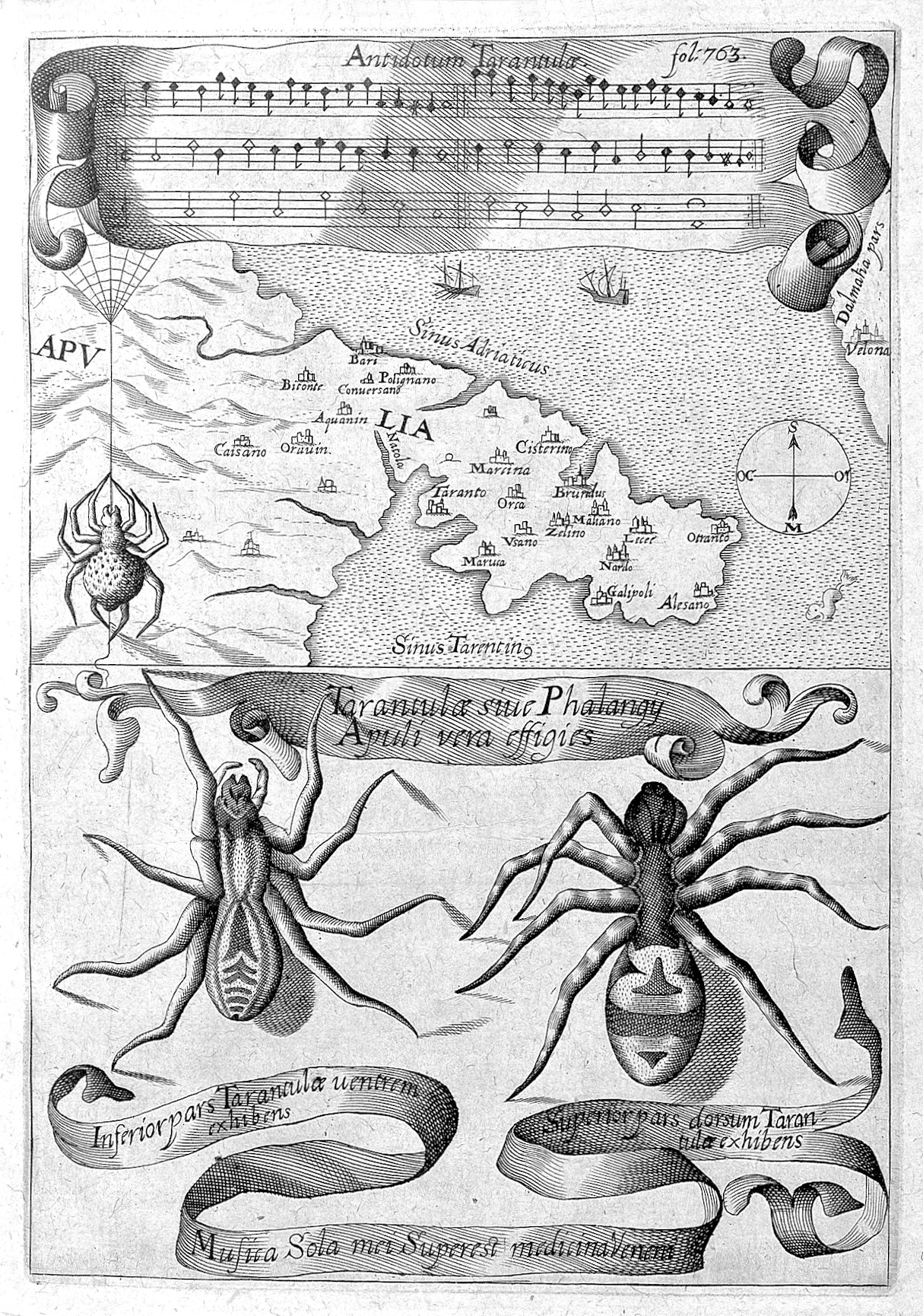
Illustration from Magnes about tarantism

While Magnes is noted today primarily for its arguments against Copernicanism, the work addressed a wide variety of different phenomena, including some that have no relationship to the modern scientific understanding of magnetism. There was a scholarly debate in Kircher's time as to whether 'magnetic' powers (i.e. powers of attraction) could be used to heal wounds. Robert Fludd held that if the weapon used to cause a wound was placed against it, the wound would disappear. Kircher argued that there was no magnetic cure - indeed such a cure would be the work of the devil. While he dismissed the notion of a magnetic cure for wounds, he devoted a chapter of Magnes to tarantism as a cure for a spider bite - an example, he believed, of magnetic forces of attraction inherent in music.

== Illustrations ==
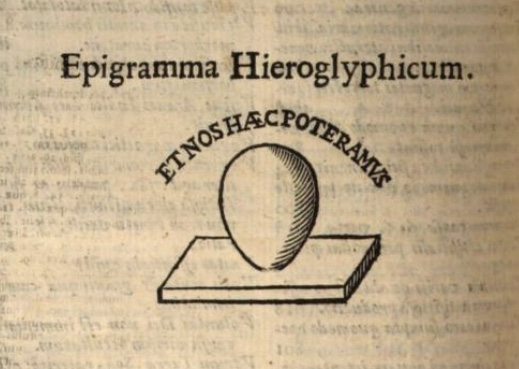
Final illustration in “ Magnes sive de arte magnetica”

Kircher's first work on magnetism, Ars Magnesia, had contained only modest woodcut illustrations. In contrast Magnes was illustrated not only with more than 150 woodcuts but with 32 full-page engraved plates. It was the first of Kircher's works to combine woodcuts with copperplate engravings. These illustrations were both technically challenging to create and expensive to produce. Two of the illustrations were of machines with moving parts, and readers could cut the parts out and use to create working models of the machinery themselves. On reading the first edition soon after it was published, Evangelista Torricelli wrote to his teacher Galileo that it was a pleasure to read and "enriched with a wealth of beautiful engravings."

The frontispiece of the first edition is by Claudio Dagli. It depicts the double-headed imperial eagle of the Hapsburg dynasty. It hangs by a magnetised chain from the imperial crown that supports an orb and a cross. Both the crown and the cross are struck through with magnetised arrows pointing towards a heavenly source, but not directly at the all-seeing eye of god directly above - perhaps a reference to magnetic declination. In one of its claws the eagle holds the crowns of Austria, Hungry and Bohemia, held together by magnetism, while in the other it holds the sceptres of the three realms, similarly linked by magnetic force. Arrows from the bird's outstretched wings project imperial power to the lands below. A lodestone on the eagle's breast carries the dedication to Emperor Ferdinand III and a banner above the eagle's head carries the Latin motto Regna Quis Adiunxit Regnis Nova Sceptra Coronis ("He has added kingdoms to kingdoms and new sceptres to crowns"). A second banner curling around its feet carries the Latin pun Et Boreae Et Austri-Acus (""Needle of the north and south - 'austriacus' also meaning 'Austrian'). In the third edition the dedication to Ferdinand III is replaced on the breast of the eagle by his portrait.

In the first edition there is also a second frontispiece to Book III, designed by Giovanni Battista Rinalducci and executed by Giovanni Battista Ficavazza. This is intended as a graphic illustration of the interconnectedness of scientific disciplines. Fourteen of these are depicted, with theology at the top, accompanied by philosophy, physics, poetry, rhetoric, cosmography, mechanics, perspective, music, natural magic, medicine, astronomy, arithmetic and geography, linked by a golden chain. At the centre of the ring they create sits an emblem of the Mundus Archetypus ('world of archetypes'), containing the all-seeing eye of God, and immediately around it stand representations of Mundus Sidereus ('the world of stars'), Mundus Sublunaris ('the sublunar world') and Microcosmus ('the microcosm'). Weaving between these emblems was a banner bearing the motto 'omnia nodis arcanis connexa quiescunt' ('all things are at rest, connected by secret knots'). This plate was omitted in the second edition but was remade in folio size for the third edition.

The final illustration in the book is of the egg of Columbus standing on its point on a slate and bearing the motto Et nos haec poteramus ("and we have been able to do likewise") - in other words, in producing this work, Kircher had, like Columbus, been able to do something thought to be impossible.

== Later editions ==
The second edition was published in 1643, only two years after the first, showing the work's success. It was completely reset, reducing it from around 900 to 800 pages, with every illustration redrawn. Including a number of corrections, it was published in Cologne by Kalckhoven. Kaspar Schott edited the revised third edition of the book (1654), finding and correcting a great many errors in Kircher's original text. It was the first edition in folio format, published in Rome by Blasius Deuersin and Zanobius Masottus.

== Magnetism in other works ==
Kircher was not the first scholar to write about magnetism. In 1600, William Gilbert published De Magnete ('On the Magnet'), the first modern treatise on magnetism and in 1635, Henry Gellibrand first discovered that magnetic declination changes with time. Among Jesuit scholars, Leonardo Garzoni wrote Trattati della Calamita ('Treatise on the Lodestone') (around 1580) which described the double polarity of magnets. Niccolò Cabeo used Garzoni's manuscript as the basis for his own Philosophia Magnetica. Kircher cited Gilbert, Garzoni and Cabeo in Magnes sive de Arte Magnetica. Magnetism was an important theme in Kircher's 1664 work Mundus Subterraneus as well as his 1667 book Magneticum Naturae Regnum. Many of the magnetic machines lavishly illustrated in the work were later built and displayed in Kircher's museum in Rome.
