= Licata (surname) =

Licata is a surname. Notable people with the surname include:

- Antonio Licata (1810 - 1892), Italian painter
- Augusto Licata (1851-1942), Italian painter
- Ignazio Licata (born 1958), Italian theoretical physicist, professor
- Joe Licata (born 1992), American football coach and former quarterback
- Nick Licata (disambiguation), multiple people
- Rosario Licata (born 1989), Italian footballer
- Victor Licata (c. 1912 – 1950), American mass murderer

== See also ==
- Licata (disambiguation)
