= Faccioli =

Faccioli is an Italian surname. Notable people with the surname include:

- Emir Faccioli (born 1989), Argentine footballer
- Giuseppe Faccioli (c.1877–1934), Italian electrical engineer
- Orsola Faccioli (1823–1906), Italian painter
- Raffaele Faccioli (1845–1916), Italian painter
