= Fontana dei Quattro Fiumi =

Fountain designed by Gian Lorenzo Bernini

- Fountain
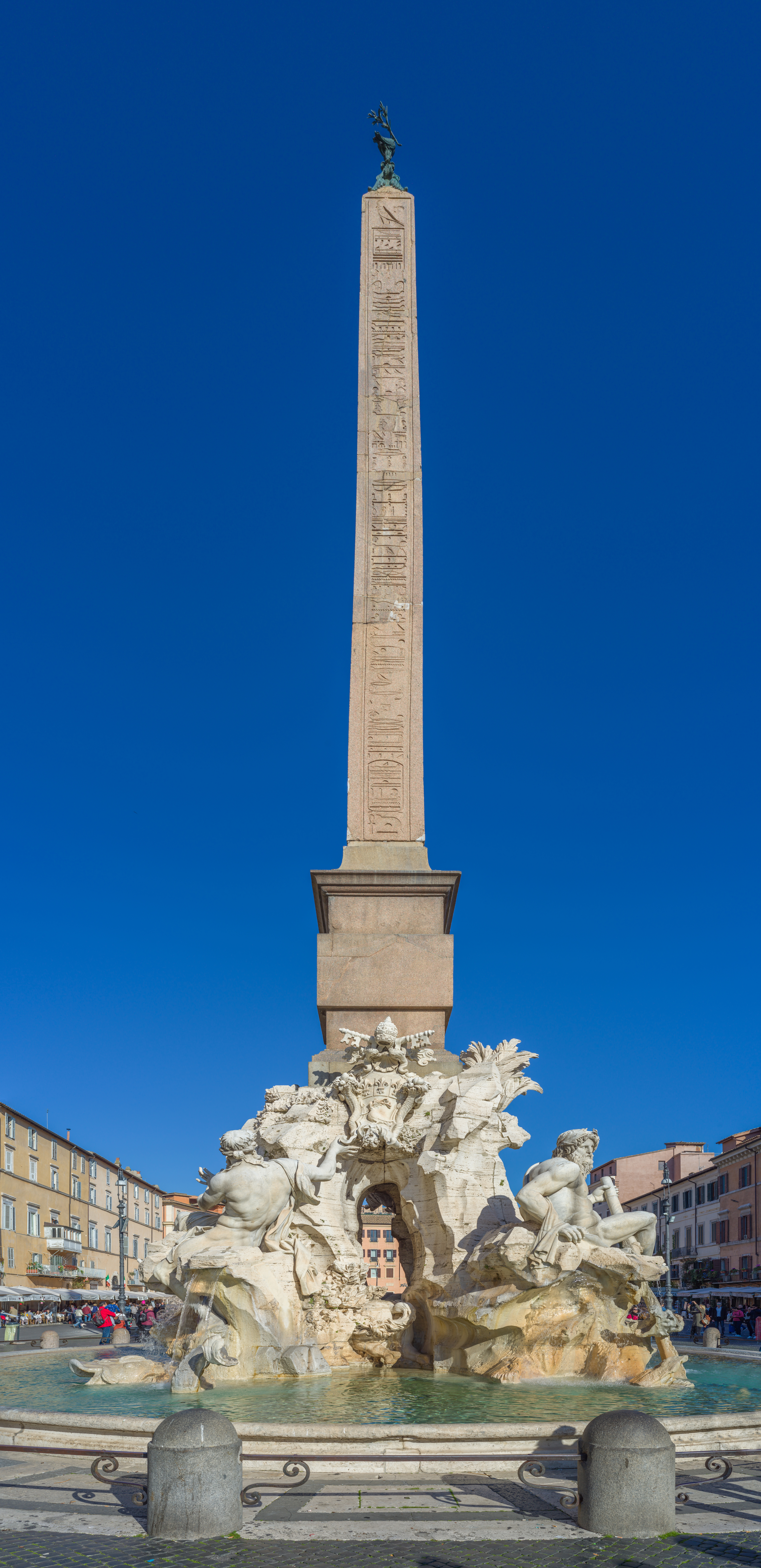
- The Fountain of the Four Rivers with the Obelisco Agonale
- Design: Gian Lorenzo Bernini
- Location: Piazza Navona, Rome, Italy
- Interactive map of Fontana dei Quattro Fiumi
- Coordinates: 41°53′56″N 12°28′23″E

Fontana dei Quattro Fiumi (Fountain of the Four Rivers) is a fountain in the Piazza Navona in Rome, Italy. It was designed in 1651 by Gian Lorenzo Bernini for Pope Innocent X whose family palace, the Palazzo Pamphili, faced onto the piazza as did the church of Sant'Agnese in Agone of which Innocent was the sponsor.

== Description ==
The base of the fountain is a basin from the centre of which travertine rocks rise to support four river gods and above them, a Roman copy of an Egyptian obelisk surmounted with the Pamphili family emblem of a dove with an olive twig. Collectively, they represent four major rivers of the four continents through which papal authority had spread: the Nile representing Africa, the Danube representing Europe, the Ganges representing Asia, and the Río de la Plata representing the Americas.

== Design ==
Bernini's design was selected in competition. The circumstances of his victory are described as follows in Filippo Baldinucci's The life of Cavaliere Bernini (1682):

So strong was the sinister influence of the rivals of Bernini on the mind of Innocent that when he planned to set up in Piazza Navona the great obelisk brought to Rome by the Emperor Caracalla, which had been buried for a long time at Capo di Bove for the adornment of a magnificent fountain, the Pope had designs made by the leading architects of Rome without an order for one to Bernini. Prince Niccolò Ludovisi, whose wife was niece to the pope, persuaded Bernini to prepare a model, and arrange for it to be secretly installed in a room in the Palazzo Pamphili that the Pope had to pass. When the meal was finished, seeing such a noble creation, he stopped almost in ecstasy. Being prince of the keenest judgment and the loftiest ideas, after admiring it, said: "This is a trick … It will be necessary to employ Bernini in spite of those who do not wish it, for he who desires not to use Bernini’s designs, must take care not to see them."

Public fountains in Rome served multiple purposes: first, they were highly needed sources of water for neighbors in the centuries prior to home plumbing. Second, they were monuments to the papal patrons. Earlier Bernini fountains had been the Fountain of the Triton in Piazza Barberini, the Fountain of the Moor in the southern end of Piazza Navona erected during the Barberini papacy, and the Neptune and Triton for Villa Peretti Montalto, whose statuary now resides at Victoria and Albert Museum in London.

Allegories of the Four Rivers

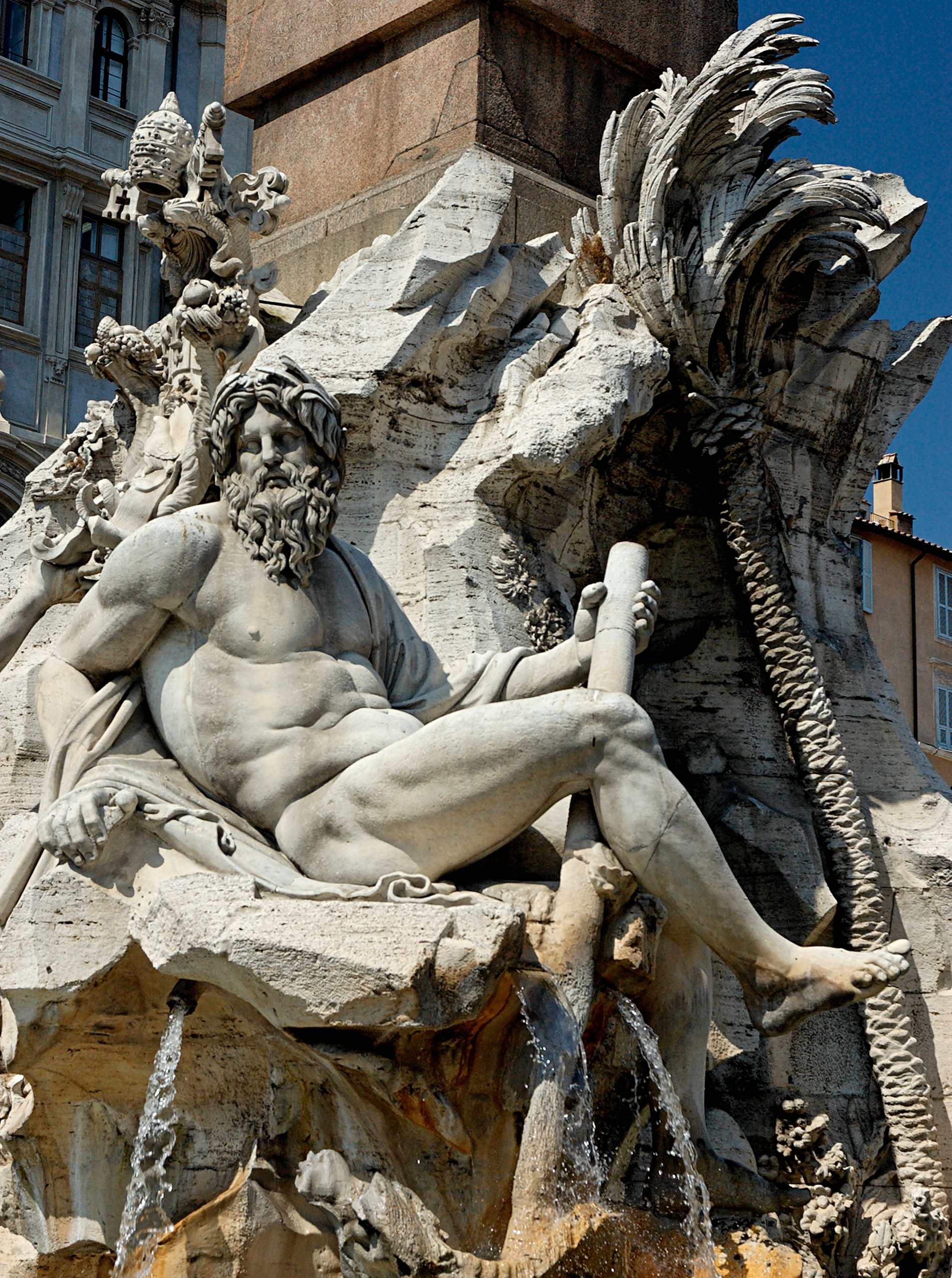
River Ganges

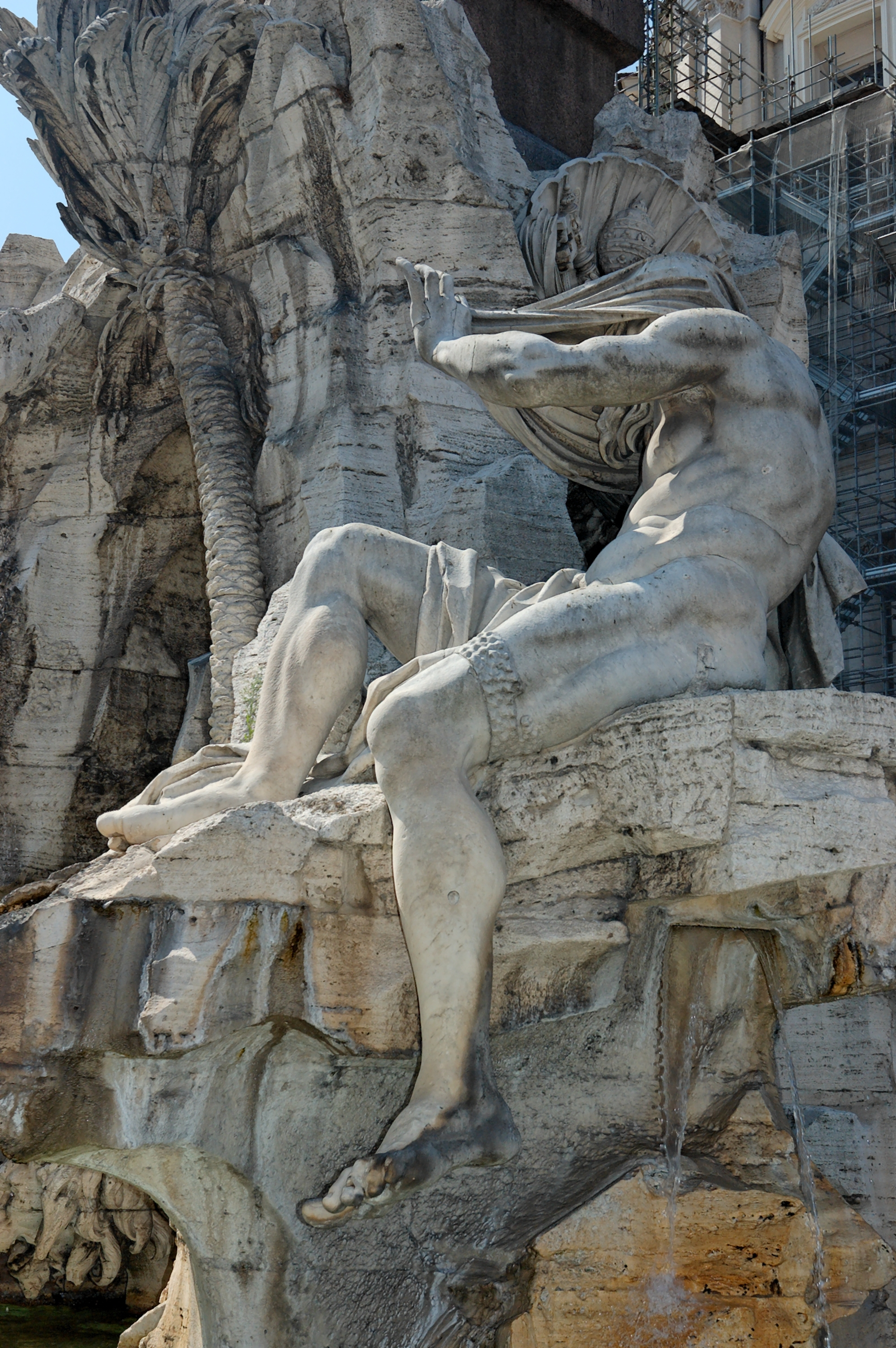
River Nile

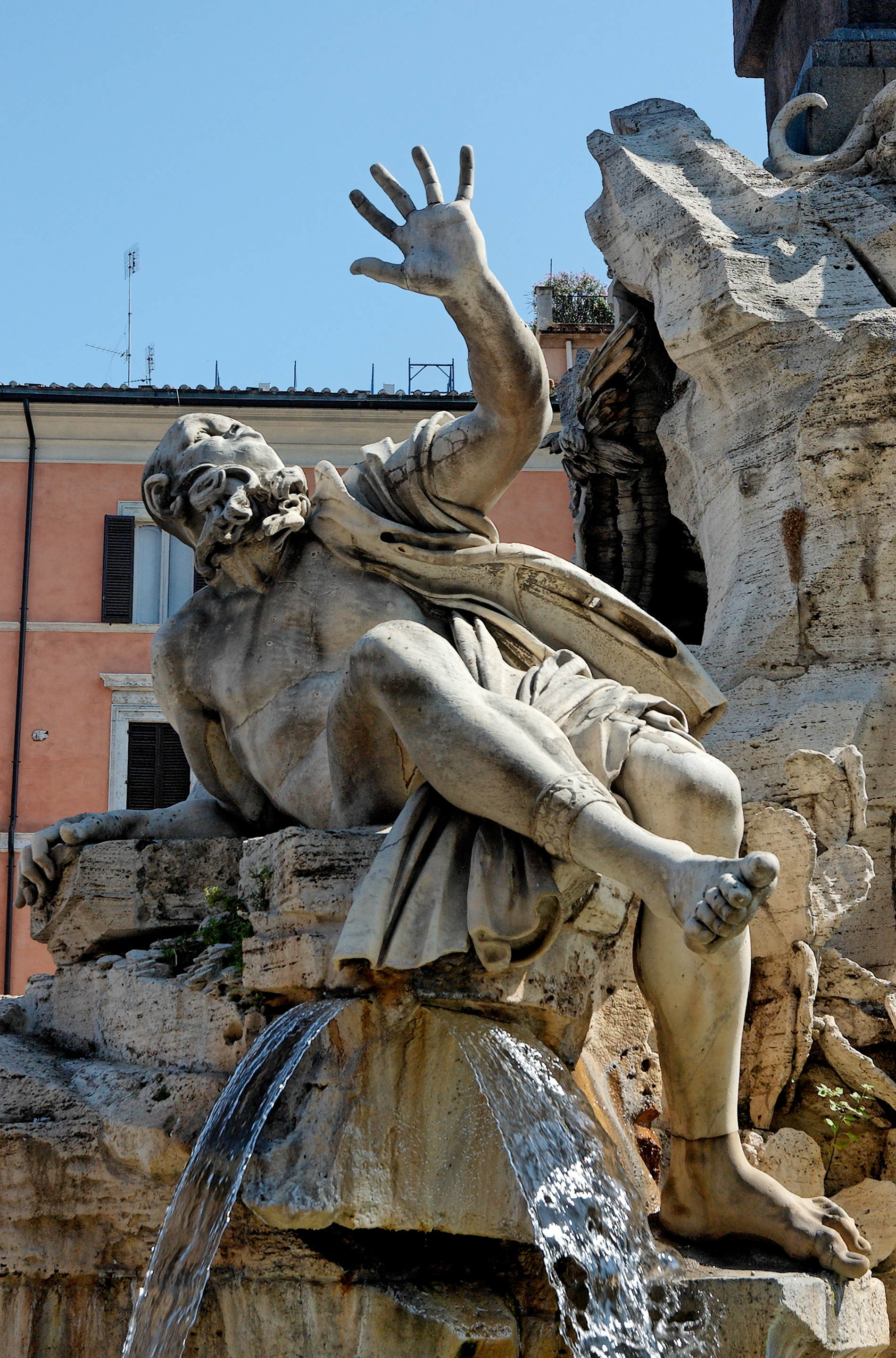
River de la Plata

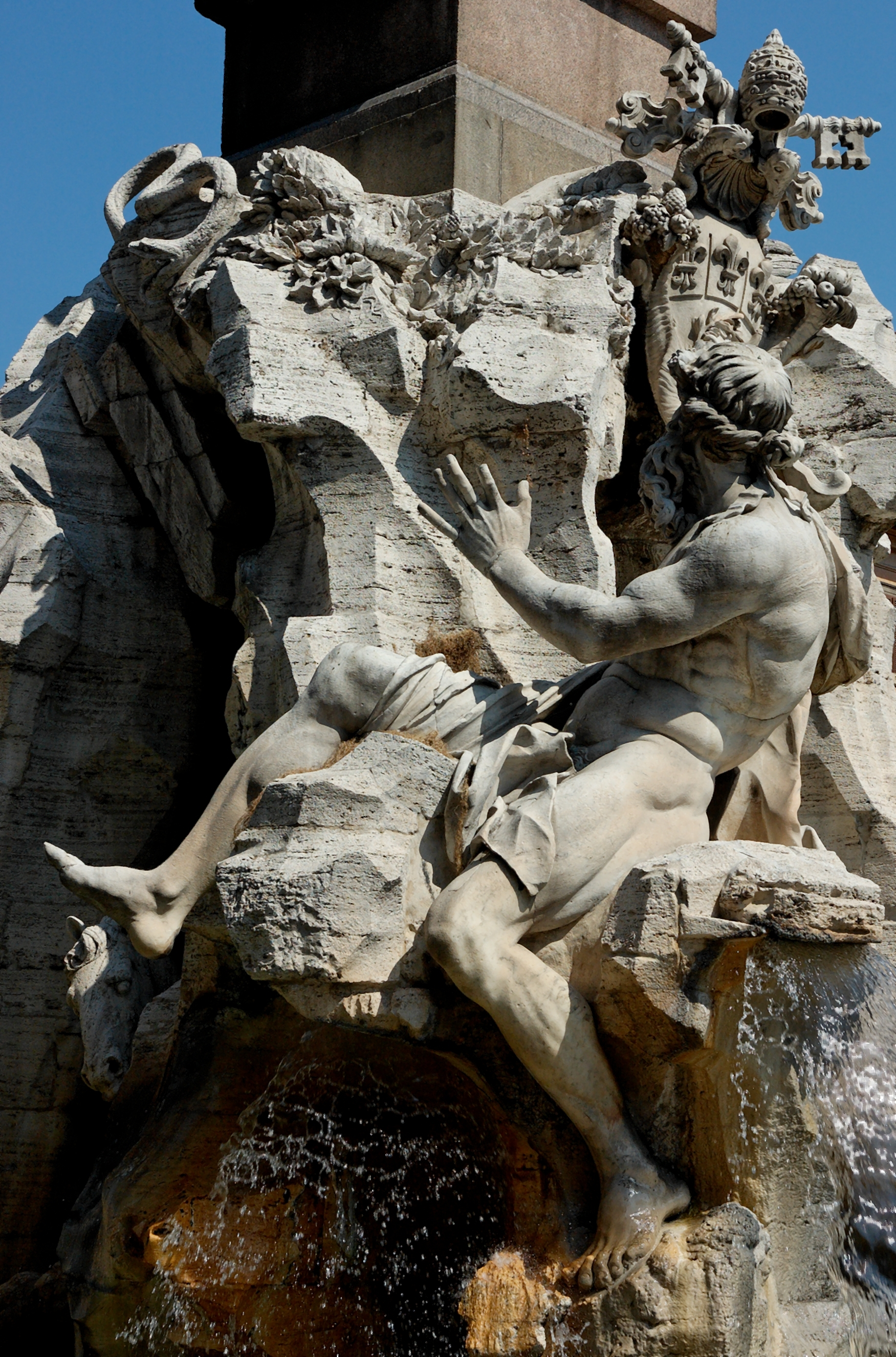
River Danube

Each has animals and plants that further carry forth identification, and each carries a certain number of allegories and metaphors with it. The Ganges carries a long oar, representing the river's navigability. The Nile's head is draped with a loose piece of cloth, meaning that no one at that time knew exactly where the Nile's source was. The Danube touches the Pope's personal coat of arms, since it is the large river closest to Rome. And the Río de la Plata is sitting on a pile of coins, a symbol of the riches America could offer to Europe (the word plata means "silver" in Spanish). Also, the Río de la Plata looks scared by a snake, showing rich men's fear that their money could be stolen. Each is a river god, semi-prostrate, in awe of the central tower, epitomized by the slender Egyptian obelisk (Obelisco Agonale), symbolizing Papal power surmounted by the Pamphili symbol (dove). In addition, the fountain is a theater in the round, a spectacle of action, that can be strolled around. Water flows and splashes from a jagged and pierced mountainous disorder of travertine marble. A legend, common with tour-guides, is that Bernini covered the head of the Nile as if the sculpture couldn't bear to look at the facade of the church of Sant'Agnese by his rival Borromini; in reality, the fountain was completed several years before Borromini began work on the church.

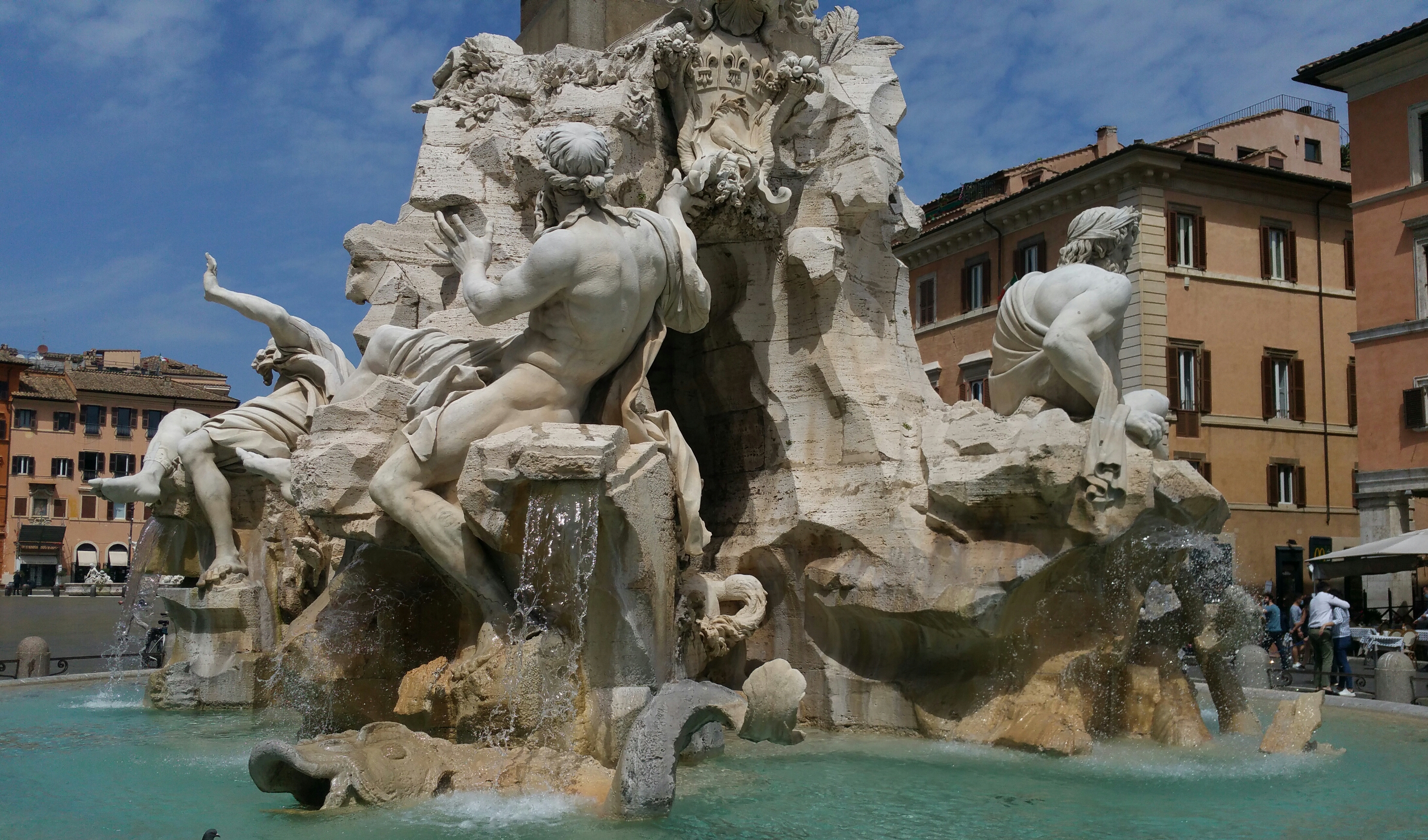
The splashing water of the Fontana dei Quattro Fiumi (1648−1651, Gian Lorenzo Bernini), situated in the centre of Piazza Navona, on an early summer day

Bernini's design was influenced by the design of the Monument of the Four Moors (Monumento dei Quattro mori) and it may have also been influenced by a fountain in Marino, Lazio which was constructed to commemorate the defeat of the Ottomans at Lepanto in 1571. This fountain served as an inspiration for Francesco Robba's (1698–1757) Robba fountain, which stands at Town Square in Ljubljana, the capital of Slovenia. It is one of the city's most recognisable symbols.

The dynamic fusion of architecture and sculpture made this fountain revolutionary when compared to prior Roman projects, such as the stilted designs Acqua Felice and Paola by Domenico Fontana in Piazza San Bernardo (1585–87) or the customary embellished geometric floral-shaped basin below a jet of water such as the Fontanina in Piazza Campitelli (1589) by Giacomo della Porta. According to Simon Schama, "At that time it was surely the greatest water spectacle in any urban space in Europe."

== Unveiling ==
The Fontana dei Quattro Fiumi was unveiled to the populace of Rome on 12 June 1651. According to a report from the time, an event was organised to draw people to the Piazza Navona. Beforehand, wooden scaffolding, overlaid with curtains, had hidden the fountain, though probably not the obelisk, which would have given people an idea that something was being built, but the precise details were unknown. Once unveiled, the full majesty of the fountain would be apparent, which the celebrations were designed to advertise. The festival was paid for by the Pamphili family, to be specific, Innocent X, who had sponsored the erection of the fountain. The most conspicuous item on the Pamphili coat of arms, an olive branch, was brandished by the performers who took part in the event.

The author of the report, Antonio Bernal, takes his readers through the hours leading up to the unveiling. The celebrations were announced by a woman, dressed as the allegorical character of Fame, being paraded around the streets of Rome on a carriage or float. She was sumptuously dressed, with wings attached to her back and a long trumpet in her hand. Bernal notes that "she went gracefully through all the streets and all the districts that are found among the seven hills of Rome, often blowing the round bronze [the trumpet], and urging everyone to make their way to that famous Piazza." A second carriage followed her; this time another woman was dressed as the allegorical figure of Curiosity. According to the report, she continued exhorting the people to go towards the piazza. Bernal describes the clamour and noise of the people as they discussed the upcoming event.

The report is actually less detailed about the process of publicly unveiling the fountain. However, it does give ample descriptions of the responses of the spectators who had gathered in the Piazza. Once there, Bernal notes, the citizens of the city were overwhelmed by the massive fountain, with its huge lifelike figures. The report mentions the "enraptured souls" of the population, the fountain, which "gushes out a wealth of silvery treasures" causing "no little wonder" in the onlookers. Bernal then continues to describe the fountain, making continuous reference to the seeming naturalism of the figures and its astonishing effect on those in the piazza.

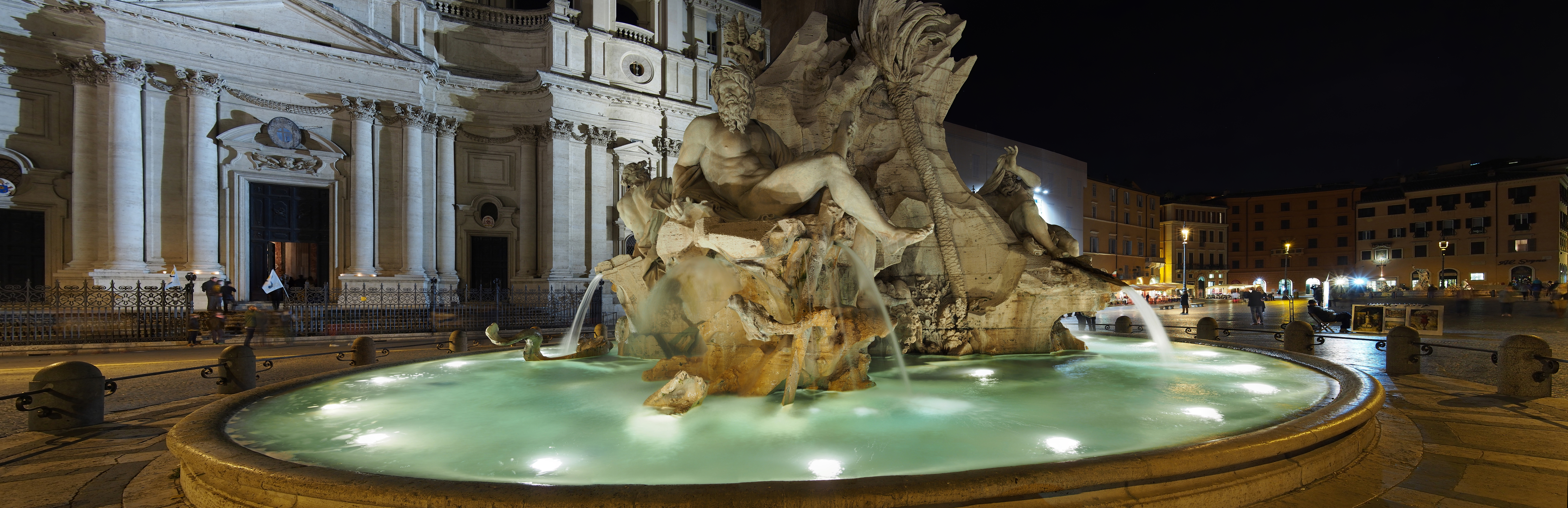
Fountain of the Four Rivers by night with river god Ganges in the front.

The making of the fountain was met by opposition by the people of Rome for several reasons. First, Innocent X had the fountain built at public expense during the intense famine of 1646–48. Throughout the construction of the fountain, the city murmured and talk of riot was in the air. Pasquinade writers protested against the construction of the fountain in September 1648 by attaching hand-written invectives on the stone blocks used to make the obelisk. These pasquinades read, "We do not want Obelisks and Fountains, it is bread that we want. Bread, Bread, Bread!" Innocent quickly had the authors arrested, and disguised spies patrol the Pasquino statue and Piazza Navona.

The street vendors of the market also opposed the construction of the fountain, as Innocent X expelled them from the piazza. The Pamphili pope believed they detracted from the magnificence of the square. The vendors refused to move, and the papal police had to chase them from the piazza. Roman Jews, in particular, lamented the closing of the Navona, since they had been allowed to sell used articles of clothing there at the Wednesday market.

== See also ==
- Obeliscus Pamphilius
- List of works by Gian Lorenzo Bernini
- Fontaines de la Concorde - Fountains in Paris commemorating rivers

Preceded by Fontanone di Ponte Sisto	Landmarks of Rome; Fontana dei Quattro Fiumi	Succeeded by Quattro Fontane
