= Licata (disambiguation) =

Licata is a city and comune located on the south coast of Sicily, Italy.

Licata may also refer to:

- A.S.D. Licata Calcio, Italian association football club located in Licata, Sicily
- Licata Airfield, abandoned World War II military airfield in Italy, near Licata, Sicily.
- Licata (surname), Italian surname
