= Augusto Licata =

Italian painter

Augusto Licata (August 31, 1851 – 1942) was an Italian painter, of Realist portraits and genre subjects.

== Biography ==
He was the first-born son of the painters Antonio Licata and his wife Orsola Faccioli, born during his father's sojourn in Rome. He studied in the Neapolitan Institute of Fine Arts under Domenico Morelli. Augusto's father had been linked with the institute. Augusto was named in 1902 honorary professor of Design for poster work at the institute.

Among his works are: Opera pia; Head of prete; Head of giovane; Napoletanina; Contadinella; Pagine d'Album; and Popolana.

Licata died in Naples in 1942.
