= Orsola Faccioli =

Italian painter (1823–1906)

Orsola Faccioli or Licata Faccioli (August 16, 1823 –1906) was an Italian painter, mainly of vedute and interior scenes.

== Biography ==
She was born in Vicenza, the last of seven siblings, of which only three reached adulthood. Her family arranged for her to study at the Accademia of Venice. In a number of contests, she won the silver medal at the Accademia. In 1848, she married professor Siciliano Antonio (Antonino) Licata. She moved with him to Naples, but exhibited and traveled throughout Italy with him, till his death in 1892.

In 1867, she was named instructor of elements of design at the Neapolitan Istituto Privati degli Educandati femminili. She was elected Academic Associates of the Academy of Fine Arts of Perugia, and of the Academy of Venice in 1864.

In the Pinacoteca di Vicenza there is a vedute incorporating historical events: Victor Emmanuel II shows himself to the people of Vicenza from the balcony of Palazzo Chiericati (painted 1869). Among other works: L'Isola di San Giorgio of Venice and Piazza Navona of Rome (Exhibited in Rome with Società degli Amatori e Cultori, 1851). At the Pinacoteca of the Capodimonte Museum, were found: Il coro dei Cappuccini at Rome. The City of Naples possessed: La villa nazionale con la musica (nighttime interior); L'interior of the church of San Marcellino; Interior of the chapel of the Immacolata of the Chiesa dell'Ascensione a Chiaia. The Casa Reale of Naples once displayed: Interior staircase of Palazzo Reale of Naples. At Hamburg, she displayed a canvas depicting: Veduta di Capodimonte; at Venice, Una veduta di San Marcellino. Her canvas of Il fiume Bacchiglione merited a silver medal first class at the Venice exhibition. Other works include Festa del 6 ottobre (exhibited at Promotrici Salvator Rosa, Naples in 1875); Una veduta della facciata di San Giorgio al Velabro (1851, Rome Società degli Amatori e Cultori); and Arum Italicum, exhibited at Milan in 1881.

Her son, Giovanni Battista Licata (Naples 1859 – Jaldessa, near Harar, 1886), was a scientist and explorer, who was killed during a colonizing expedition by Count Pietro Porro to Harar, in Ethiopia. The other son Augusto was a painter. She is said to have stopped painting in 1892 when her husband died. She is buried in the cemetery of Poggioreale in Naples next to her husband.
