= Fontana del Moro =

Fountain in Rome

- Fountain
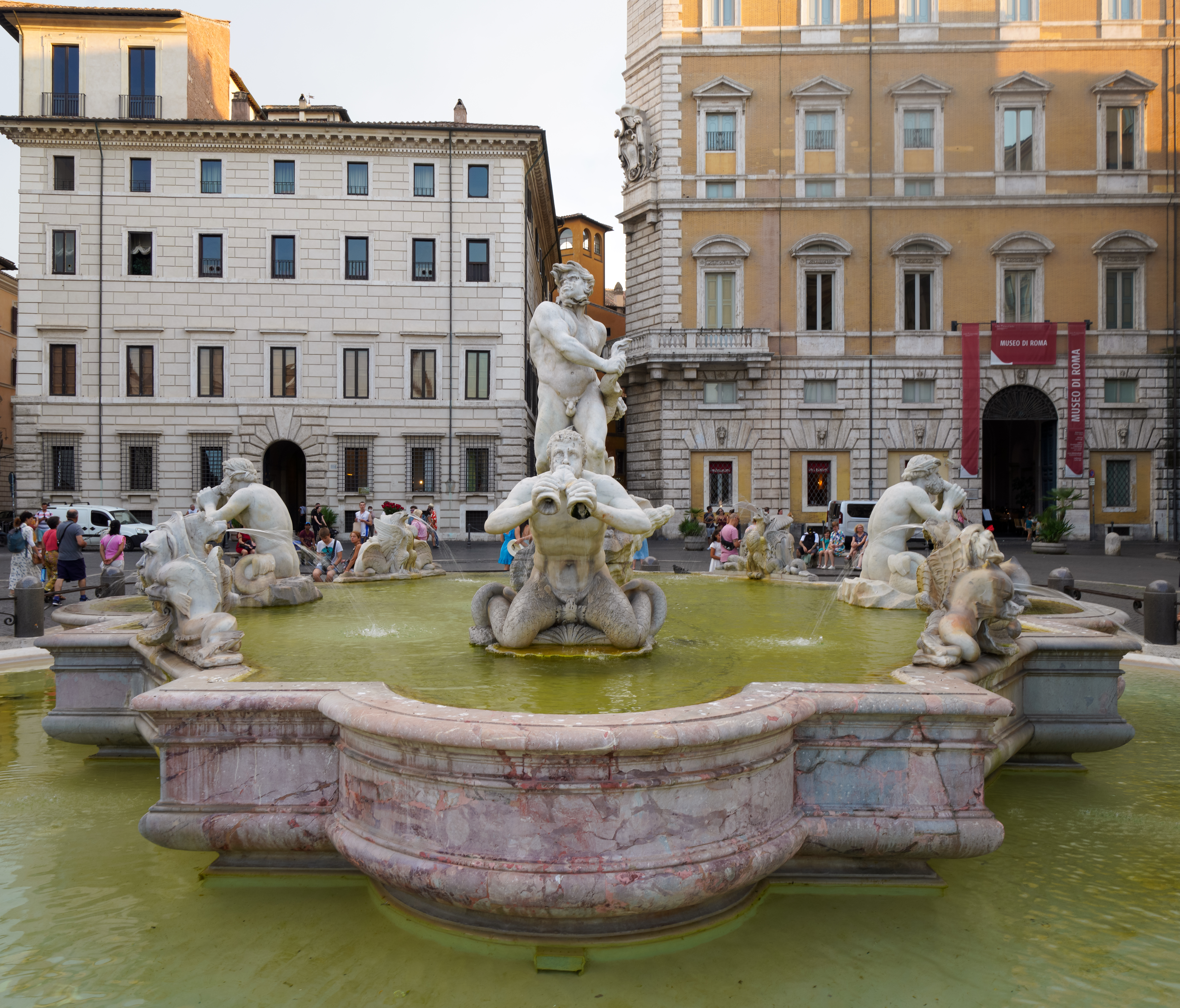
- Fontana del Moro, Piazza Navona
- Design: Giacomo della Porta, Gian Lorenzo Bernini
- Completed: 1570s by Giacomo della Porta, 1654 by Gian Lorenzo Bernini
- Location: Piazza Navona, Rome, Italy
- Interactive map of Fontana del Moro
- Coordinates: 41°53′53″N 12°28′23″E

Fontana del Moro (Fountain of the Moor) is a fountain located at the southern end of the Piazza Navona in Rome, Italy. It depicts a nautical scene with tritons, dolphins, and a conch shell. It was originally designed by Giacomo della Porta in the 1570s with later contributions from Gian Lorenzo Bernini in the 1650s. Bernini sculpted a large terracotta model of the central figure, which Giovanni Antonio Mari used as a guide when sculpting the final figure. There is a debate around whether or not the central figure was intended by Bernini to depict a Moor. Some of the original sculptures were moved to the Galleria Borghese in 1874. In 2011, the fountain was vandalized.

== Description ==
The fountain represents a Moor, or African (perhaps originally meant to be Neptune), standing in a conch shell, wrestling with a dolphin, surrounded by four Tritons. In between each triton, to make four in total, are heads that shoot water from their mouths. Each head has a pair of dolphins on either side of it and a dragon behind it. The fountain is placed in a basin of rose-colored marble.

== History ==
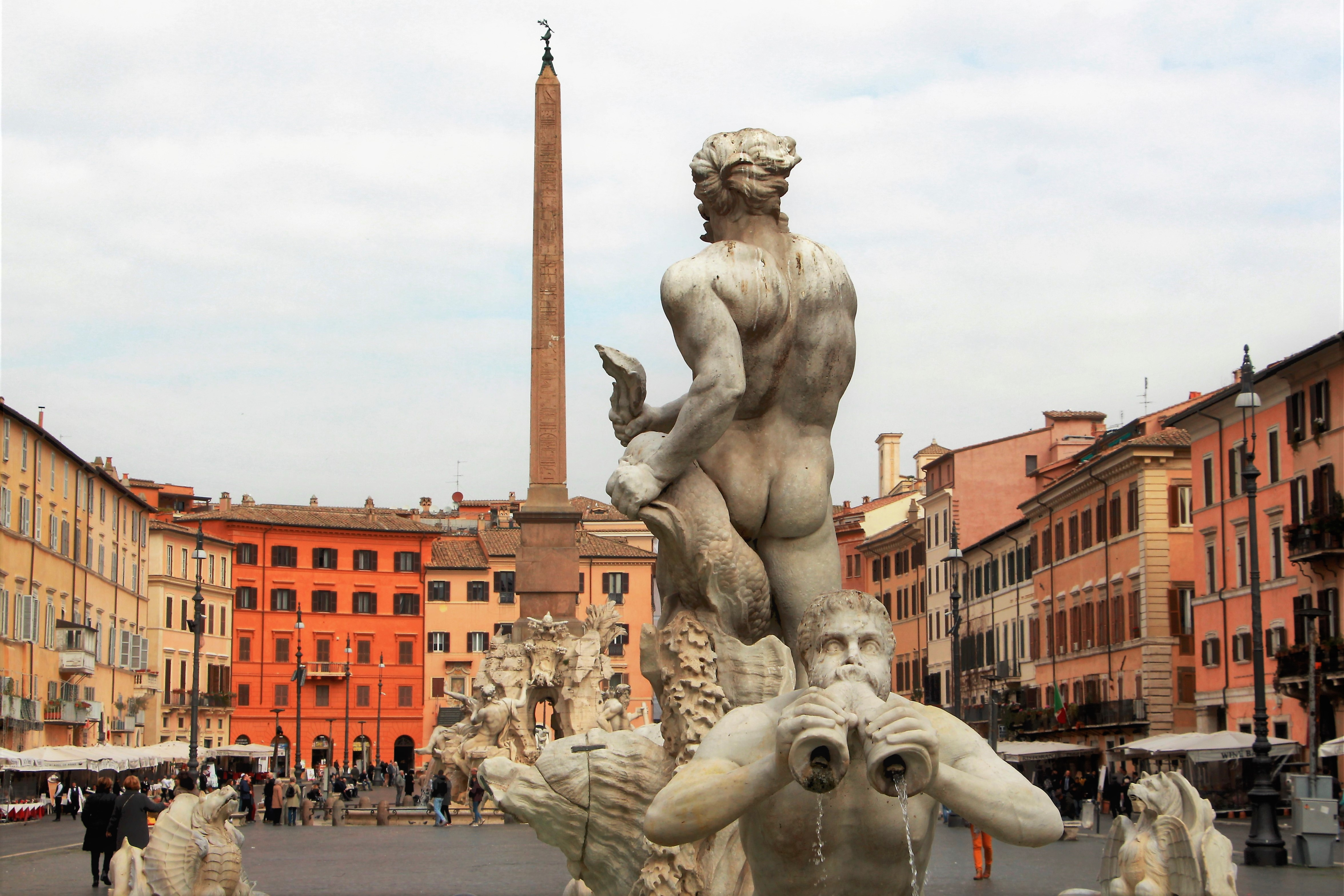
Fontana del Moro, Piazza Navona (Rome)

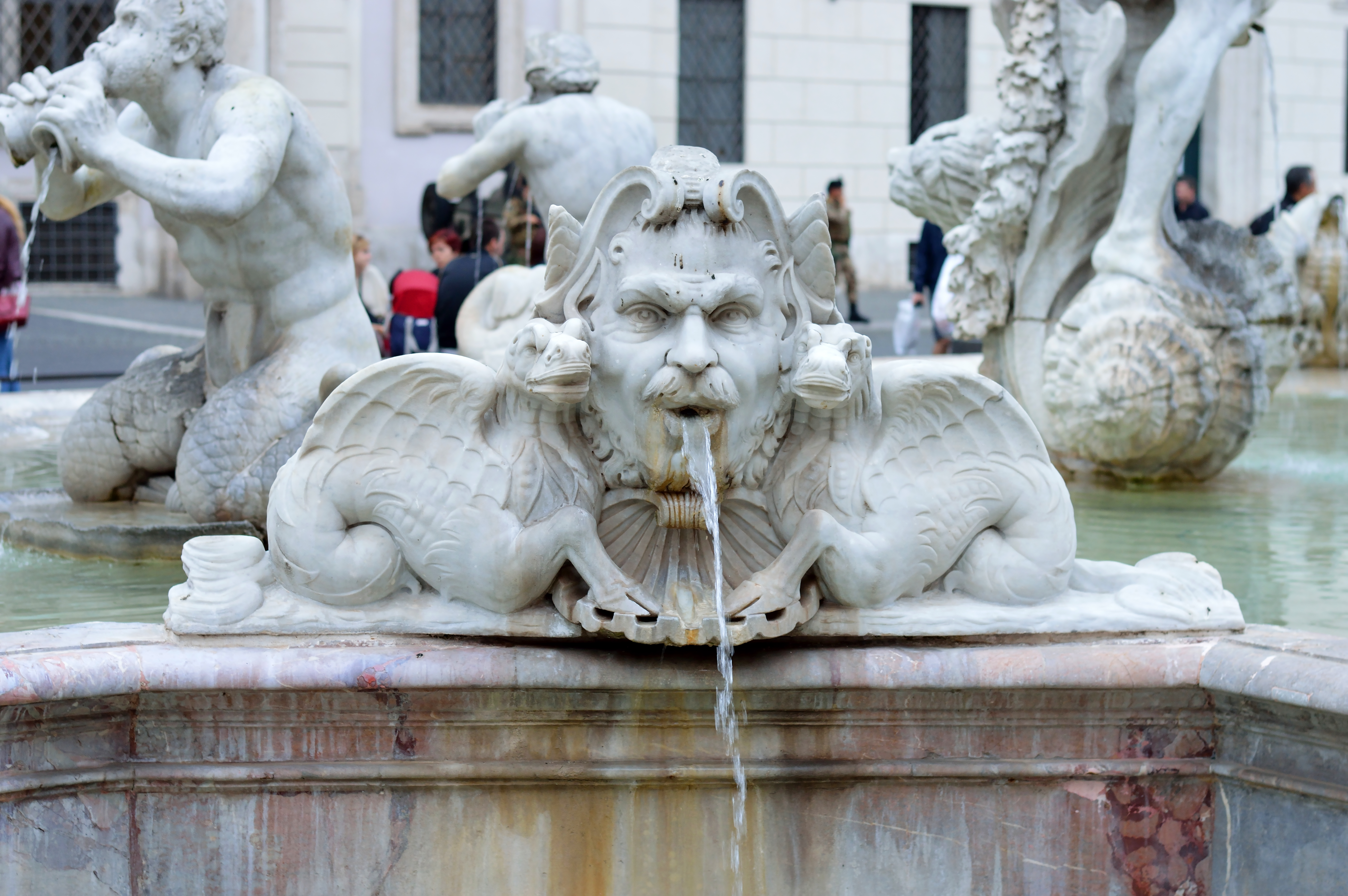
Mask on Fontana del Moro, Piazza Navona (Rome)

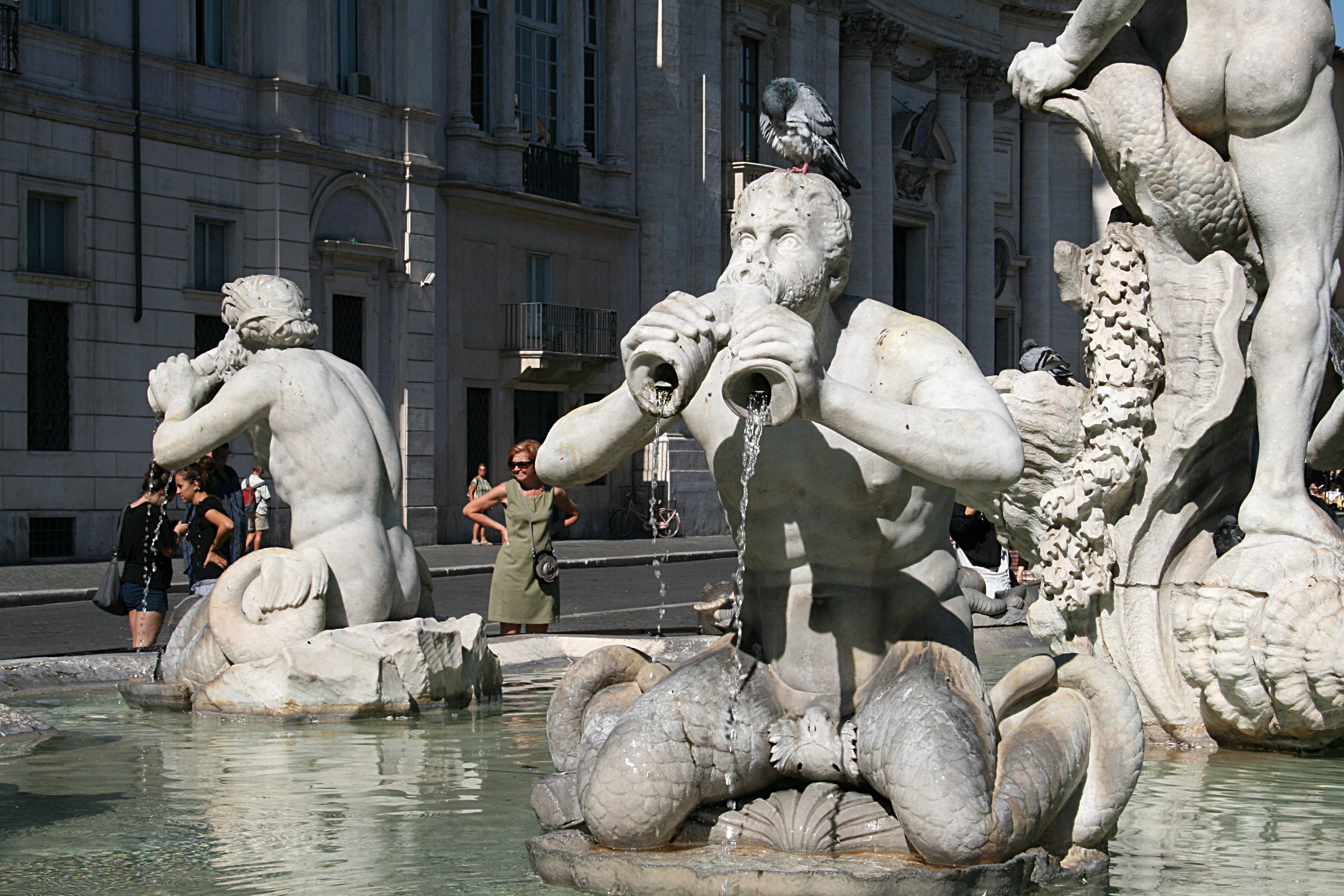
Tritons of Fontana del Moro, Piazza Navona (Rome)

=== Giacomo della Porta ===
The original design of the fountain was carried out by Giacomo della Porta in the 1570s. Its function was to hold water from the Acqua Vergine aqueduct. Ludovico Rossi was the original stone-carver who created the basins in 1575 and later the balustrades, a row of column-like objects topped with a railing, made from travertine in 1577. There were originally four entrances in the balustrade but they were blocked off with gates. Della Porta added the four tritons, which he repurposed from an earlier project. The tritons are blowing into shells, from which water pours out of. Della Porta enlisted the help of other sculptors to carve four heads, each flanked by a pair of dolphins. Each head pours water from its mouth and has a dragon attached to its back that also pours water from its mouth. Della Porta included the dragons in his design to pay homage to his commissioner, Pope Gregory XIII, whose coat-of-arms featured a dragon. Della Porta originally planned on incorporating a column in the center, but this was not completed and instead the centerpiece was a rock.

=== Gian Lorenzo Bernini ===
In 1651, following Gian Lorenzo Bernini’s completion of the Fountain of the Four Rivers, Pope Innocent X was so impressed with Bernini's work on the fountain that he decided to commission Bernini yet again. Pope Innocent X determined that the other two fountains in the Piazza Navona needed to be refurbished. Bernini was chosen to restore both fountains, including the Southern one, which would become Fontana del Moro. Bernini had experience with creating nautical inspired artworks, such as Fontana del Tritone and Neptune and Triton. Bernini’s fountains were inspired by those in Florence that featured fictional characters. With the restoration of Fontana del Moro, he removed the original balustrade and added another basin around the original one. Bernini’s original design for the new centerpiece featured three fish with tails up, and a water-spouting shell being supported by the tails. However, the centerpiece was not considered grand enough by Pope Innocent X who wanted a larger figure. This scrapped centerpiece was gifted from Pope Innocent to his sister-in-law, Olimpia Maidalchini, and was then used for her garden along River Tiber. Bernini’s second design idea consisted of two tritons holding four dolphins that spew water from their mouths. However, this idea was not used for an unsaid reason. In the final version of the fountain, Bernini took the shell from the original design then placed the triton wrangling a dolphin atop it. Bernini also added two steps below the water within the basin. Part of Bernini’s inspiration for the stance of the triton came from the Pasquino, an Ancient Roman sculpture belonging to a pair of speaking statues. Bernini created a modello for the central figure of the triton, but the final figure for the fountain was sculpted by Giovanni Antonio Mari. However, the final figure is credited to Bernini, since the design for it was his and Mari was his assistant.

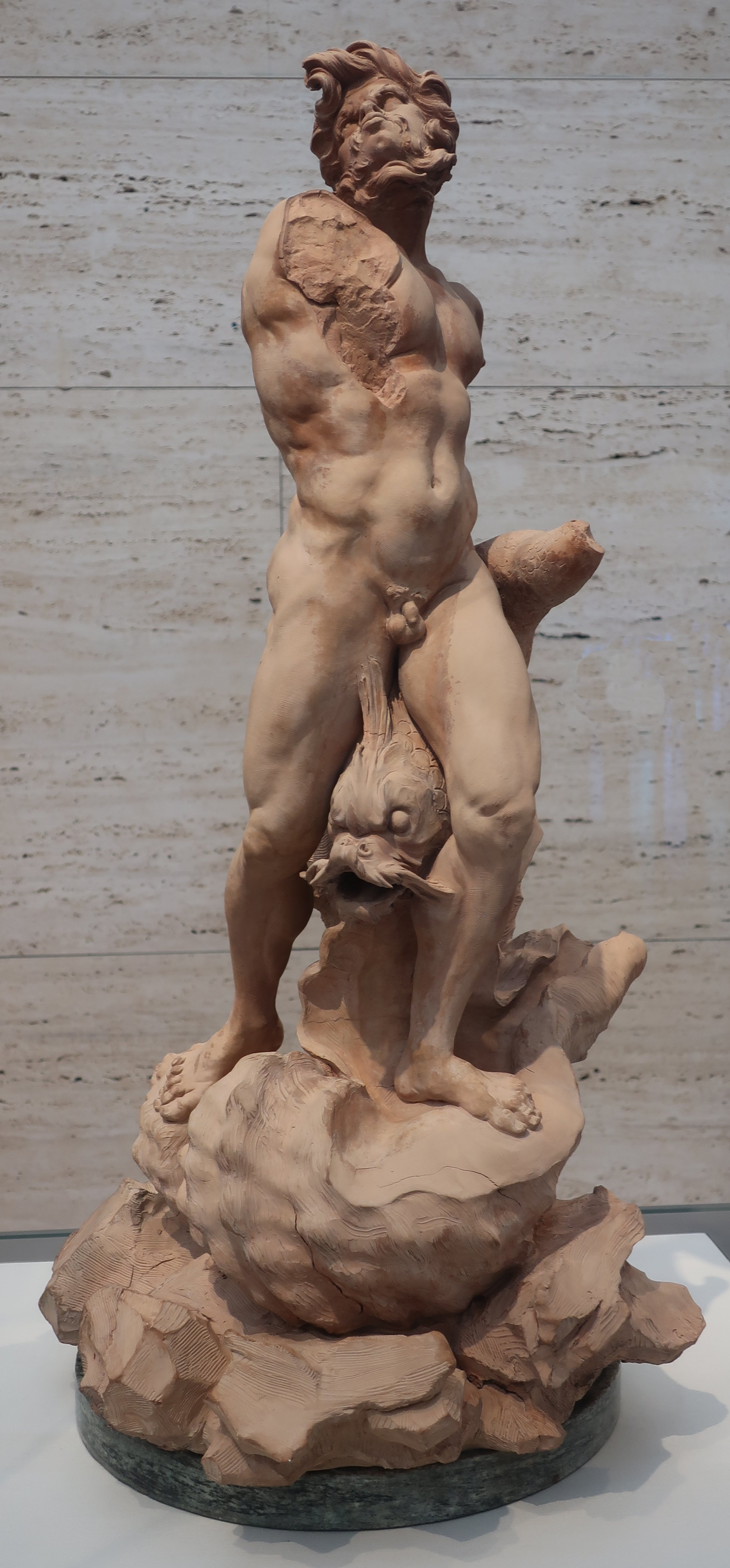
Bernini Modello for Fountain of the Moor, Kimbell Art Museum

=== Bernini's Modello ===
Bernini also crafted a terracotta model of the central figure of the fountain in 1653 to show Pope Innocent X. It is 80.5 cm tall, making it Bernini’s tallest terracotta piece. Andrew Butterfield draws attention to the fact that Bernini was heavily influenced by the classical style in this modello, specifically the works of the Pasquino, the Belvedere Torso, and the Laocoön. Though the final marble figure was carved by Giovanni Antonio Mari, Mark S. Weil points out that Bernini’s terracotta was made prior to this because it was, in Weil's professional opinion, more detailed than the final figure. Weil also acknowledges that this model, compared to others done by Bernini, seems to be one of Bernini’s most refined terracotta models. Normally, Bernini would create bozzetti, sketch clay models that are smaller in scale than a full modello. Weil notes that the modello for the Fountain of the Moor might have been more polished and complete to appease Pope Innocent X.

One aspect of the model that is different from the final is that Bernini placed both the triton and the conch on top of rocks, similar to the rocks that Giacomo della Porta had in his original design. These rocks were not included in the final statue for an unknown reason. Weil also notes that the expressions of the triton and the dolphin are more dramatic in the model than in the final. The original rock base and the conch were both to be made from travertine, which Bernini depicted in his modello through grooves and uneven texture that resembled the rock's surface. From the original design of the triton figure in Bernini’s model to the completed figure in marble, Bernini intended for it to be viewed from multiple angles. The modello for the Fountain of the Moor is currently on display at the Kimbell Art Museum in Fort Worth, Texas.

=== Relocation ===
In 1874, the original tritons and the heads, designed by Giacomo della Porta, were removed from the fountain. They were moved to the Villa Borghese, now the Galleria Borghese. Copies of these sculptures were put in the place of the originals.

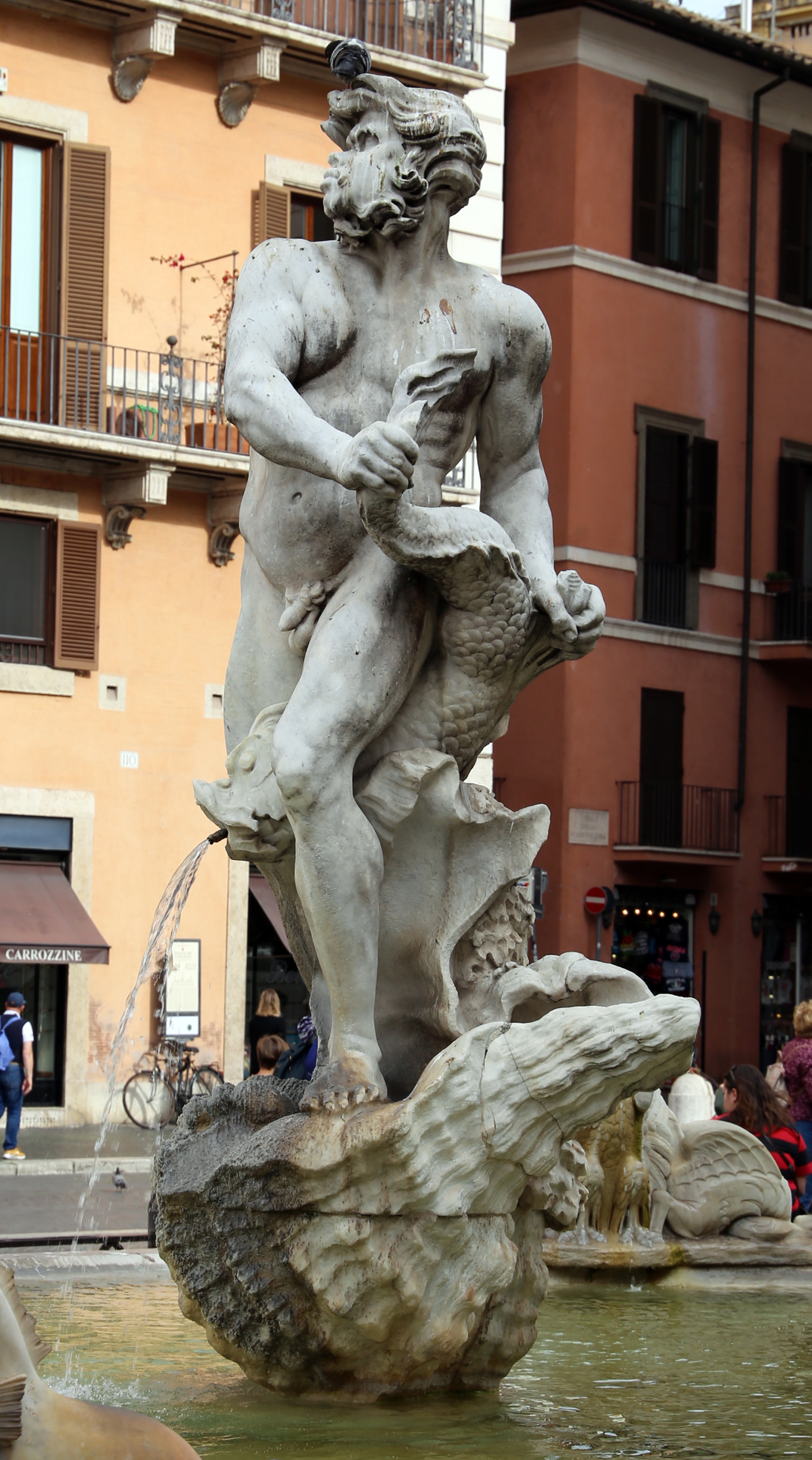
Central figure of Fontana del Moro, Piazza Navona (Rome)

== Iconography ==
The central figure in the fountain is deemed a Moor, which is a term that was used to describe Africans who were not Christians and often Muslims. Mark S. Weil points out the similarities between the face on this figure and the face of Bernini's Rio de la Plata of the Fountain of the Four Rivers, which depicts a North-African, or a Moor. The figures surrounding the Moor are tritons, also known as mermen.

While the fountain is called Fountain of the Moor, David Bindman and Henry Louis Gates, Jr. point out a controversy surrounding this title. According to Bindman and Gates, there are no sources from the time of its creation that have specific accounts of Bernini referring to it as a “moor.” There is no concrete proof that the triton was meant to be (sub-Saharan) African. Bindman and Gates do acknowledge that the facial features of this triton are similar to the African ones of the Rio de la Plata, but aside from that, say there is no further evidence that this figure is a portrayal of an African. In fact, Bernini just referred to the main figure as a “triton.” Bindman and Gates state that all the symbolism, aside from the alleged African, only relate to the sea. C.D. Dickerson and Anthony Sigel assert that "moor" is only a nickname given to the fountain and that it does not depict a Moor.

== Vandalism ==
In early September 2011, a man attacked Fontana del Moro with a rock. The man struck one of the heads and two pieces were broken off, but the pieces were restored to the fountain shortly after. The vandal is suspected to be the same man who also damaged the Trevi Fountain on the same day.

== See also ==
- List of works by Gian Lorenzo Bernini
- List of fountains in Rome

Preceded by Marforio	Landmarks of Rome; Fontana del Moro	Succeeded by Nasone
