= Nick Licata =

Nick Licata may refer to:

- Nick Licata (mobster) (1897–1974), Los Angeles mobster
- Nick Licata (politician) (born 1947), Seattle politician
