= Piazza Navona =

Public square in Rome, Italy

- City square
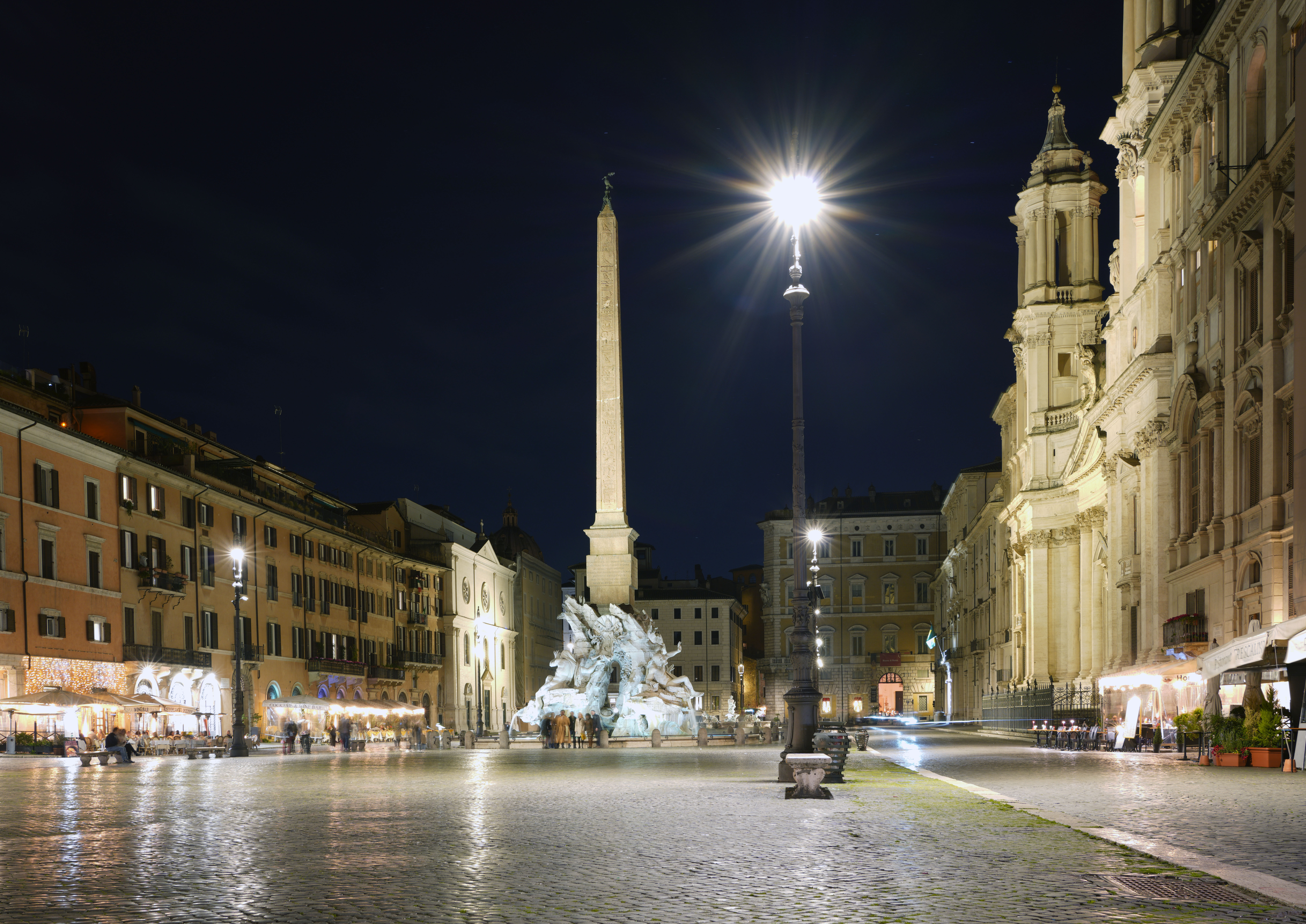
- View from the north
- Location: Rome, Italy
- Interactive map of Piazza Navona
- Coordinates: 41°53′56″N 12°28′23″E

Piazza Navona (pronounced [ˈpjattsa naˈvoːna]) is a public open space in Rome, Italy. It is built on the site of the 1st century AD Stadium of Domitian and follows the form of the open space of the stadium in an elongated oval. The ancient Romans went there to watch the agones ("games"), and hence it was known as "Circus Agonalis" ("competition arena").

In the 17th century it became a showcase for Baroque design, with work by Bernini and Borromini among others. The Fontana dei Quattro Fiumi stands in front of the Church of Sant'Agnese in Agone.

== History ==
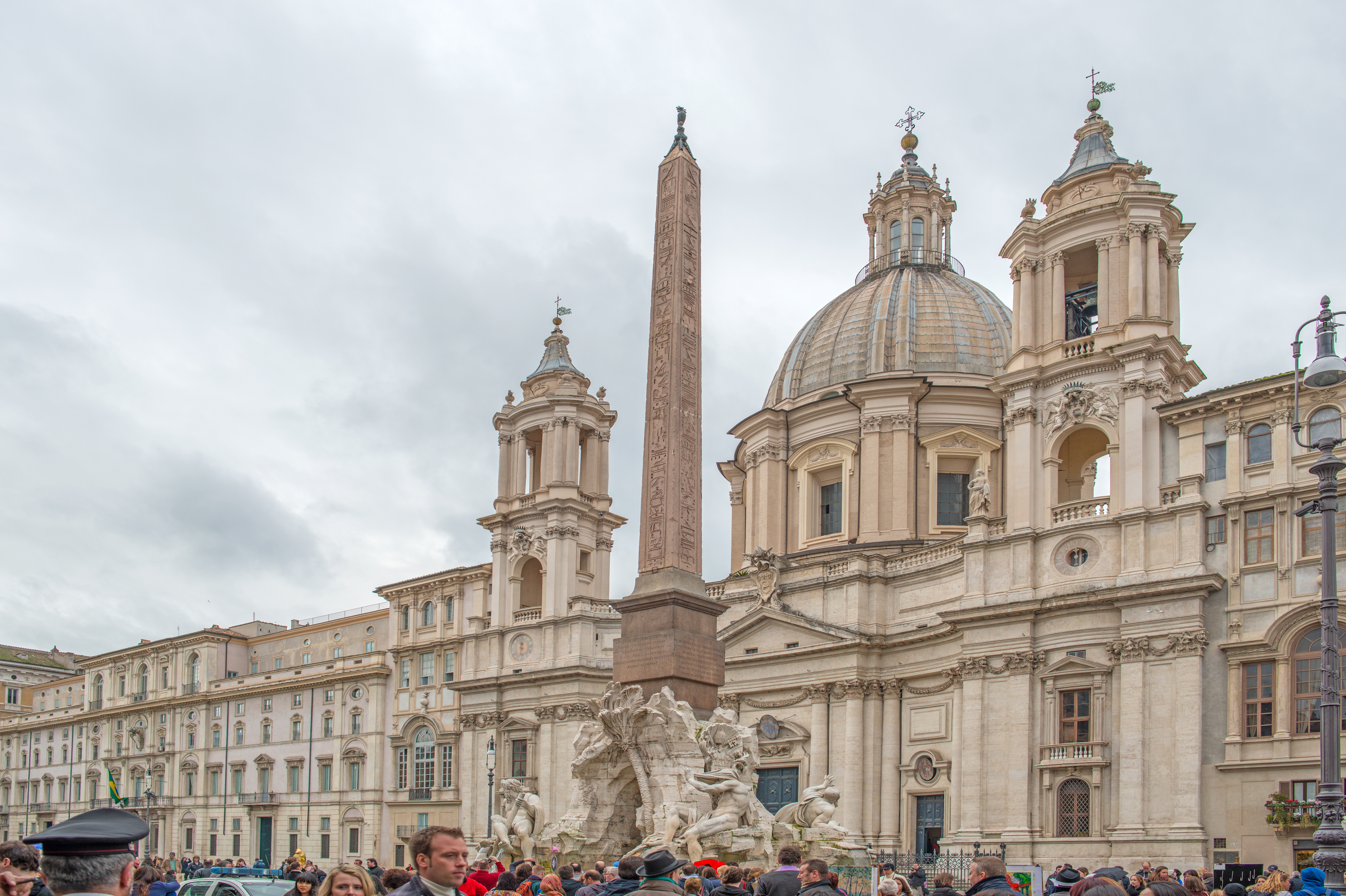
Fountain of the Four Rivers

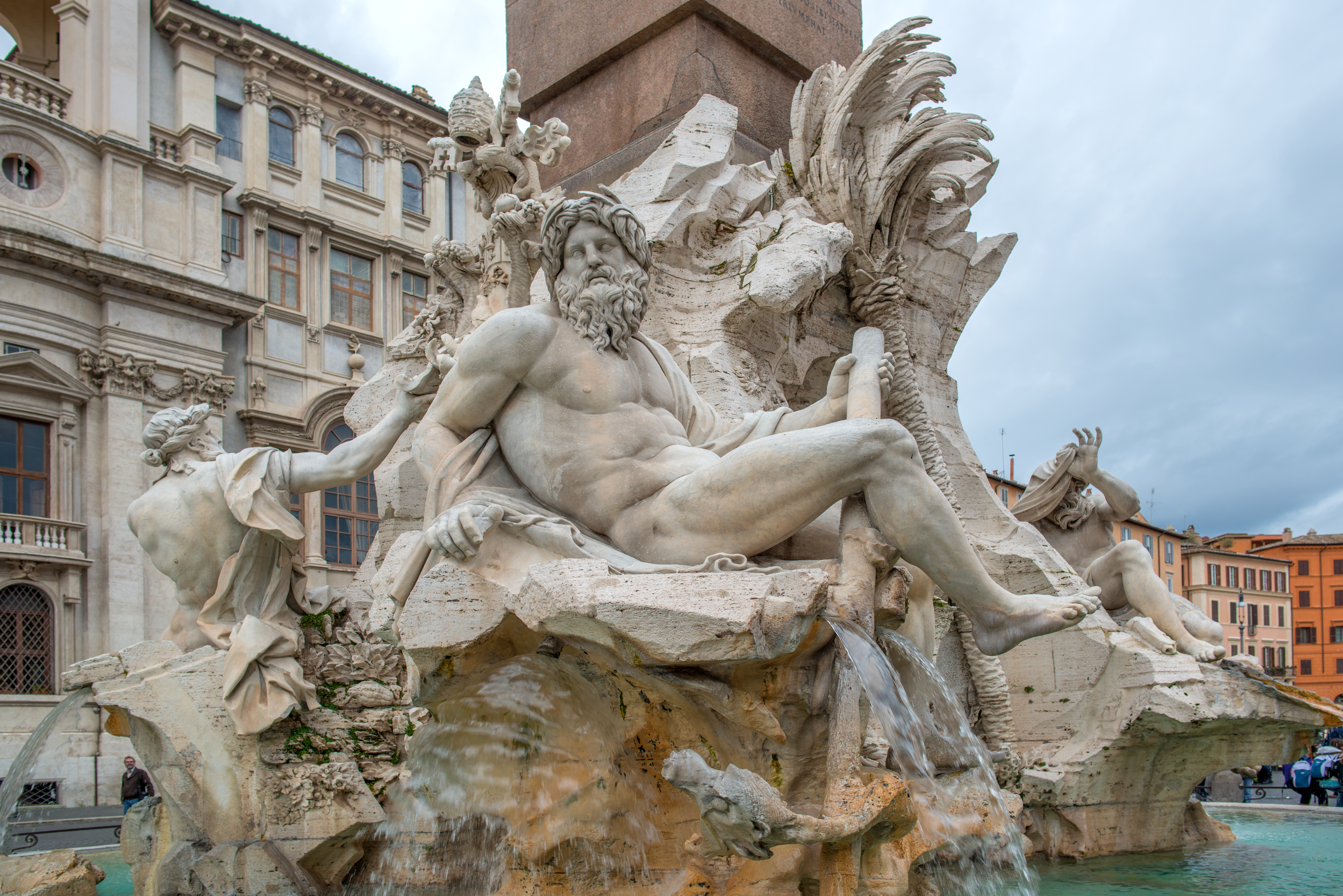
Fontana dei Quattro Fiumi

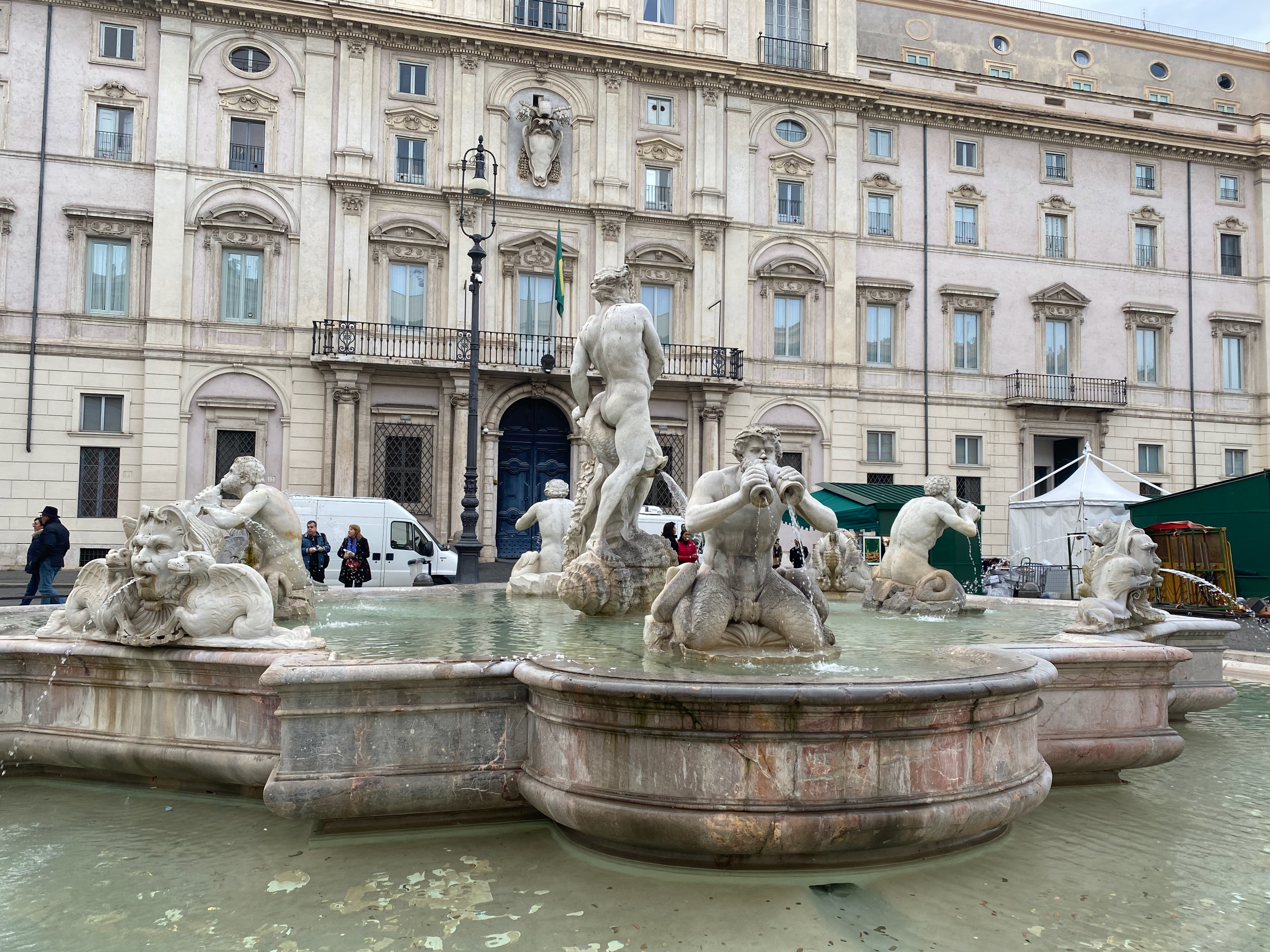
Fontana del Moro, on the southern end

The space currently occupied by the Piazza Navona was originally the Stadium of Domitian, built by Emperor Titus Flavius Domitianus starting in 80 AD. Following the fall of the western Roman Empire, the stadium fell into ruin, being quarried for building materials. There are just a few remains of that today.

Defined as a public space in the last years of the 15th century, when the city market was transferred there from the Campidoglio, Piazza Navona was transformed into a highly significant example of Baroque Roman architecture and art during the pontificate of Innocent X, who reigned from 1644 until 1655, and whose family palace, the Palazzo Pamphili, faced the piazza. It features important sculptural creations: in the centre stands the famous Fontana dei Quattro Fiumi or Fountain of the Four Rivers (1651) by Gian Lorenzo Bernini, topped by the Obelisk of Domitian, brought in pieces from the Circus of Maxentius; the church of Sant'Agnese in Agone by Francesco Borromini, Girolamo Rainaldi, Carlo Rainaldi and others; and the aforementioned Pamphili palace, also by Girolamo Rainaldi, that accommodates the long gallery designed by Borromini and frescoed by Pietro da Cortona.

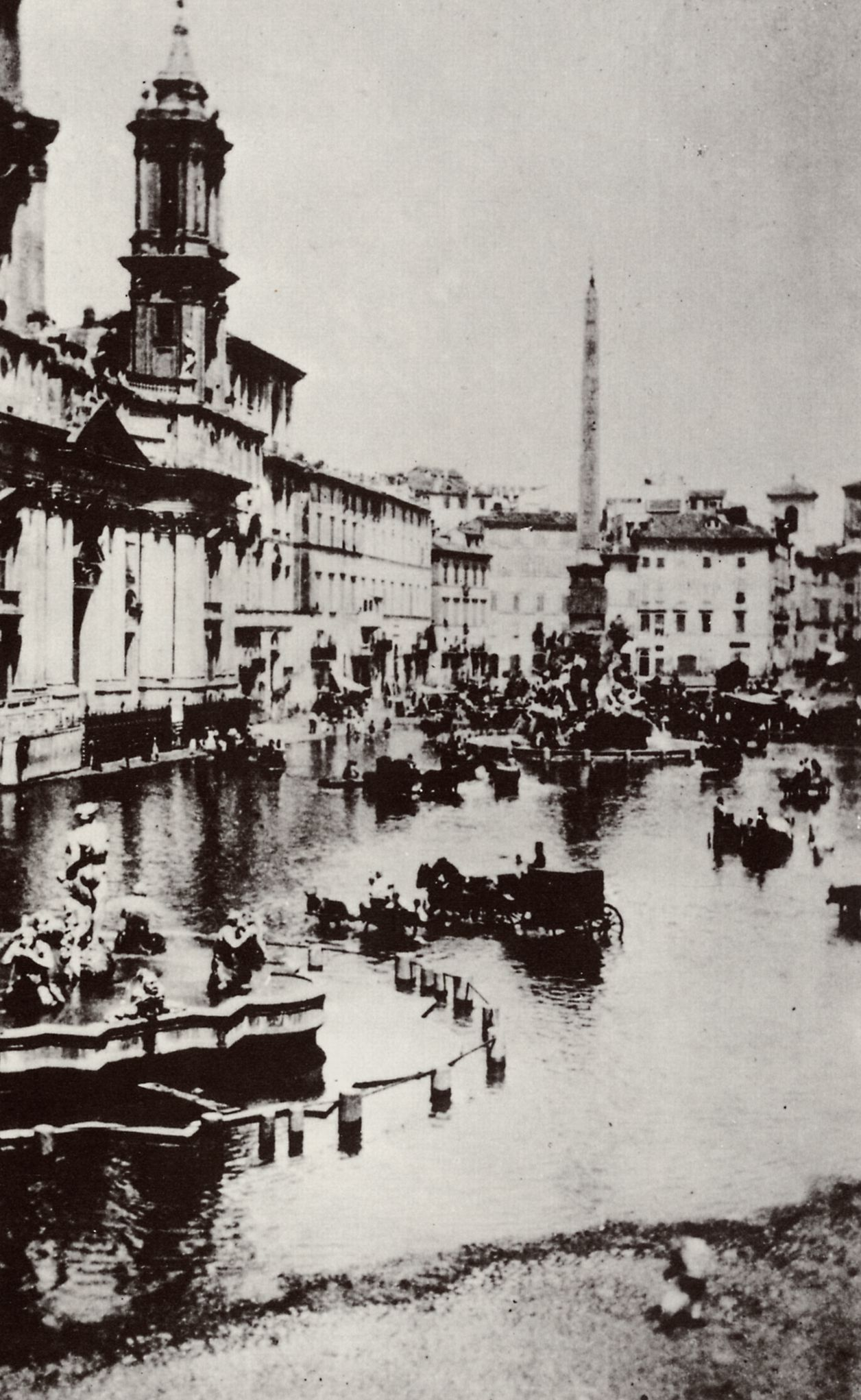
Piazza Navona flooded in 1865

Piazza Navona has two other fountains. At the southern end is the Fontana del Moro with a basin and four Tritons sculpted by Giacomo della Porta (1575) to which, in 1673, Bernini added a statue of a Moor, wrestling with a dolphin. At the northern end is the Fountain of Neptune (1574) also created by Giacomo della Porta; the statue of Neptune, by Antonio Della Bitta, was added in 1878 to create a balance with La Fontana del Moro.

During its history, the piazza has hosted theatrical events and other ephemeral activities. From 1652 until 1866, when the festival was suppressed, it was flooded on every Saturday and Sunday in August in elaborate celebrations of the Pamphili family. The pavement level was raised in the 19th century, and in 1869 the market was moved to the nearby Campo de' Fiori. A Christmas market is held in the piazza square each year from the first week of December until the first week of January.

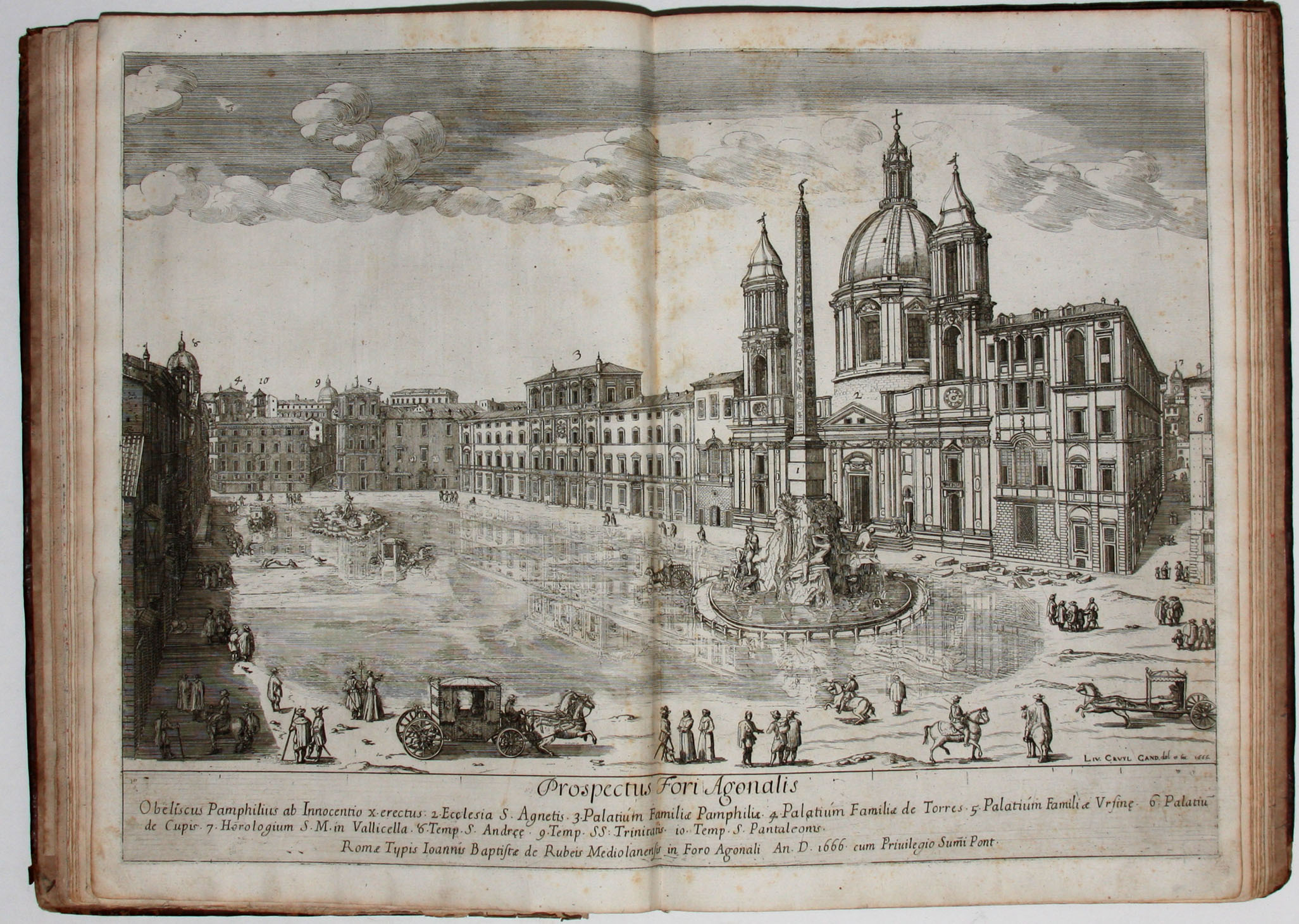
Lieven Cruyl, the Piazza Navona during the Baroque

In the early hours of 3 September 2011, the Fontana del Moro was damaged by a vandal. Police later found the man, who had been captured on security cameras climbing in the fountain, wielding a large rock and decapitating some of the larger and smaller figures, after they recognised him by his shoes.

== Other monuments ==
- Stabilimenti Spagnoli
- Palazzo de Cupis
- Palazzo Torres Massimo Lancellotti
- Church of Nostra Signora del Sacro Cuore
- Palazzo Braschi (Museo di Roma)
- Sant'Agnese in Agone

== See also ==
- Obeliscus Pamphilius
- List of tourist attractions in Rome

== Gallery ==
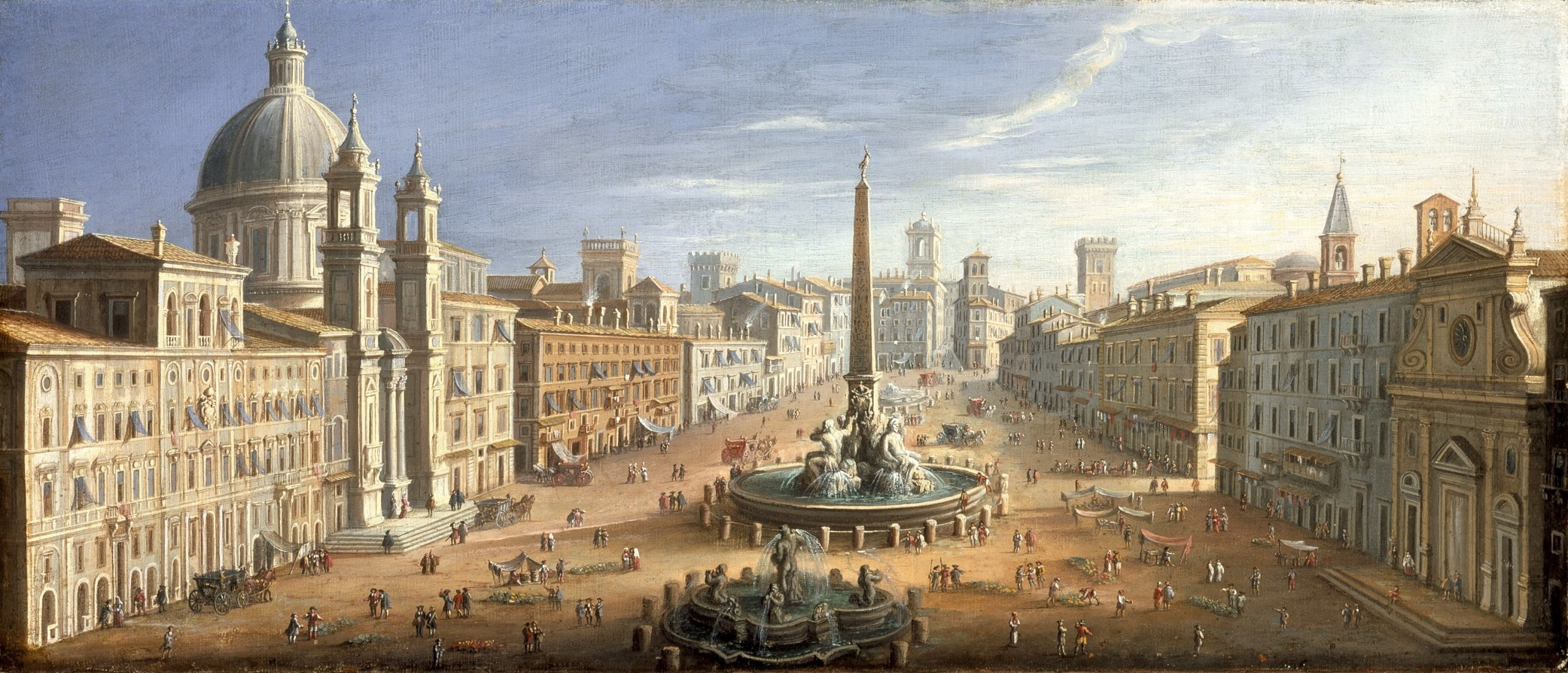
View of Piazza Navona by Hendrik Frans van Lint, c. 1730

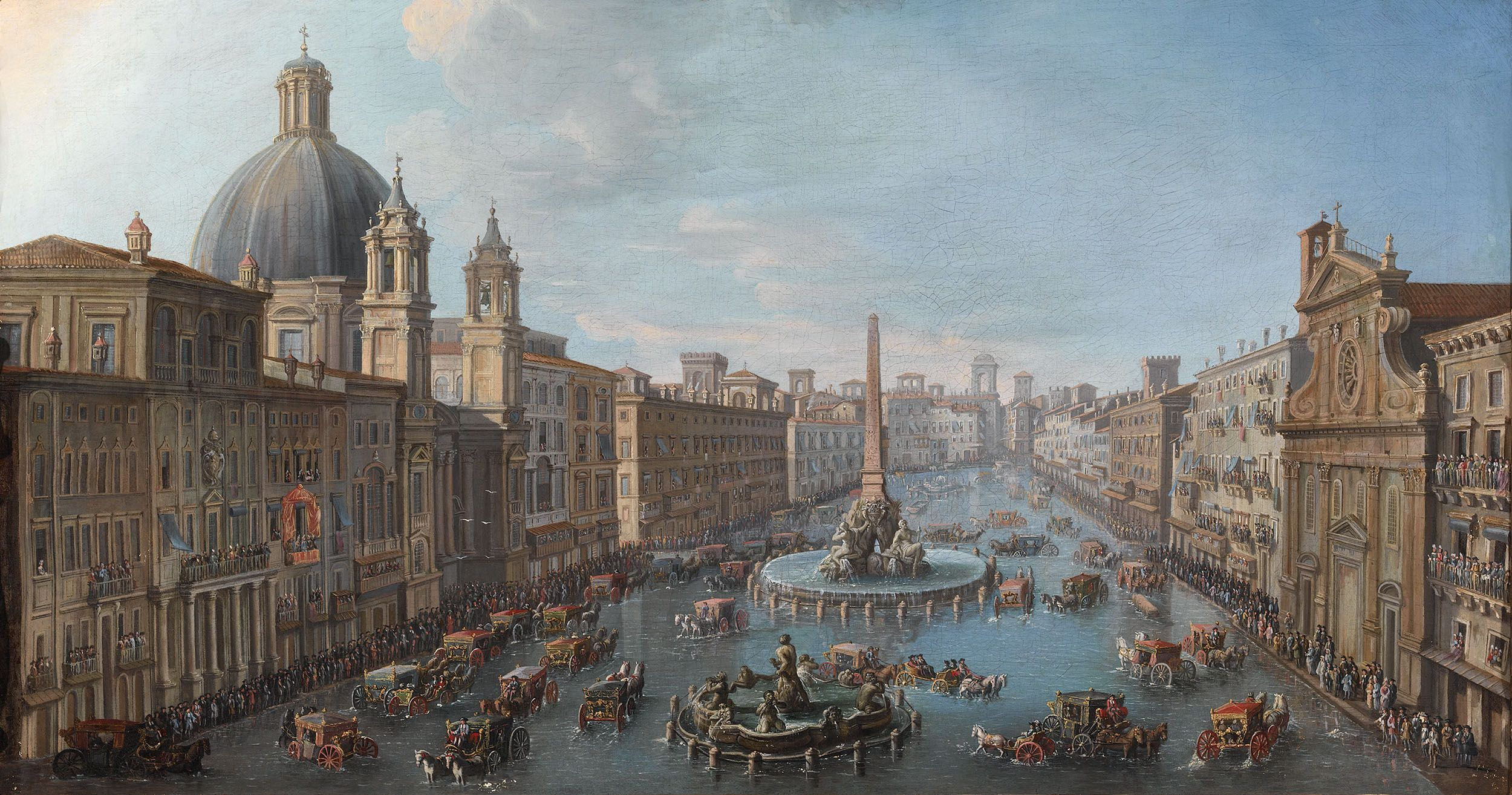
Piazza Navona Flooded by Antonio Joli. Circa 1760

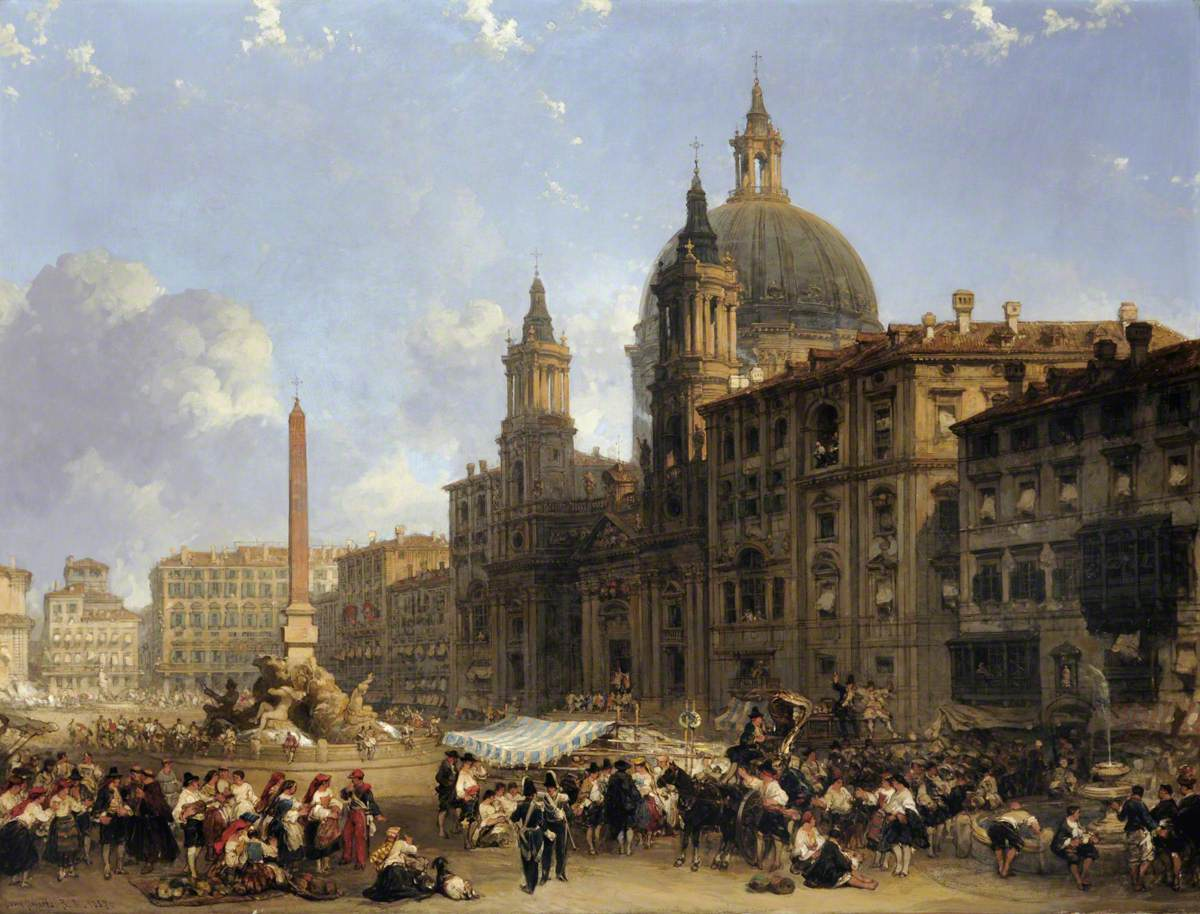
The Piazza Navona at Rome by David Roberts, 1857

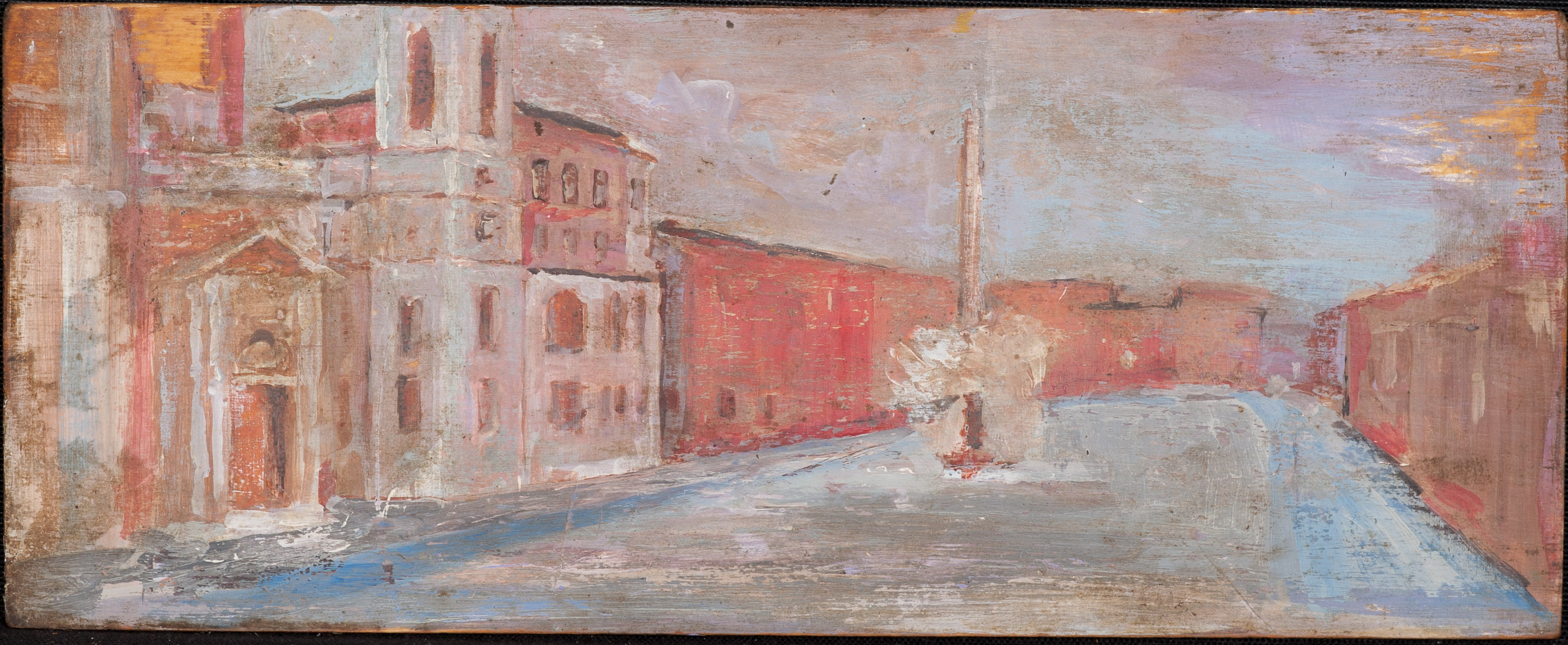
Piazza Navona by Paolo Salvati, 1962

== Notes ==
Preceded by Piazza Farnese	Landmarks of Rome; Piazza Navona	Succeeded by Piazza di Spagna
