= Giuseppe Faccioli =

Italian-American electrical engineer

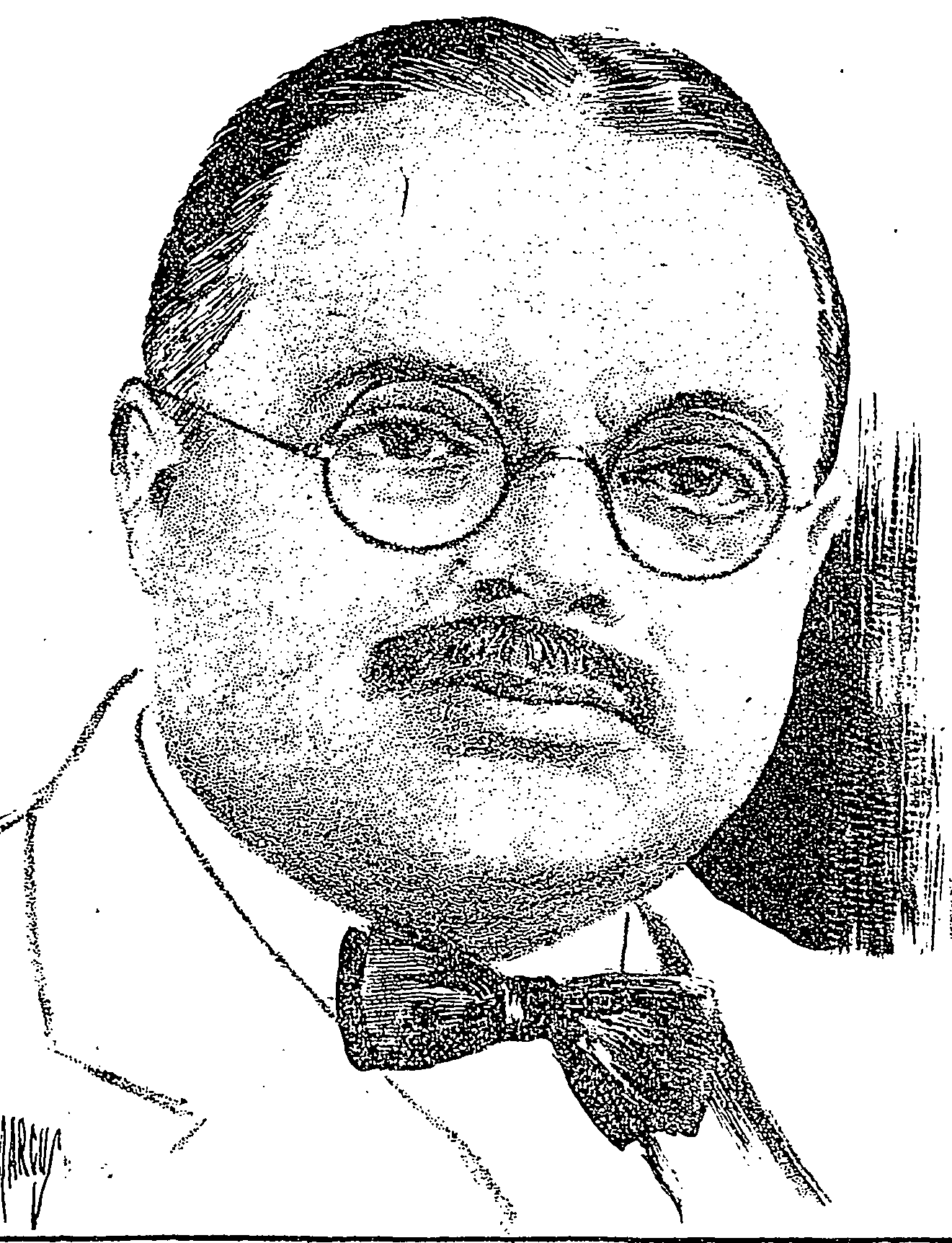

Giuseppe Faccioli (c. 1877 – January 13, 1934) was an electrical engineer, noted for his work in artificial lighting and for creating currents using potentials of 2,000,000 volts.

He attended the Royal Polytechnic Institute of Milan, graduating in 1899 and moving to the US in 1904, where he worked for the New York Edison Company, Interborough, the Crocker Wheeler Company, and Stanley Laboratories, which was absorbed by the General Electric Company in 1908. He worked there, in Pittsfield, Massachusetts, for the remainder of his career, retiring in 1930 as chief engineer.

In 1923, working with F.W. Peak Jr., and W.S. Moody, he demonstrated electric arcs created by potentials of 2,000,000 volts. In 1932 he received the Lamme Medal of the American Institute of Electrical Engineers.

He was using a wheelchair by 1923.
