= Palazzo Pamphilj =

Palace in Rome, Italy

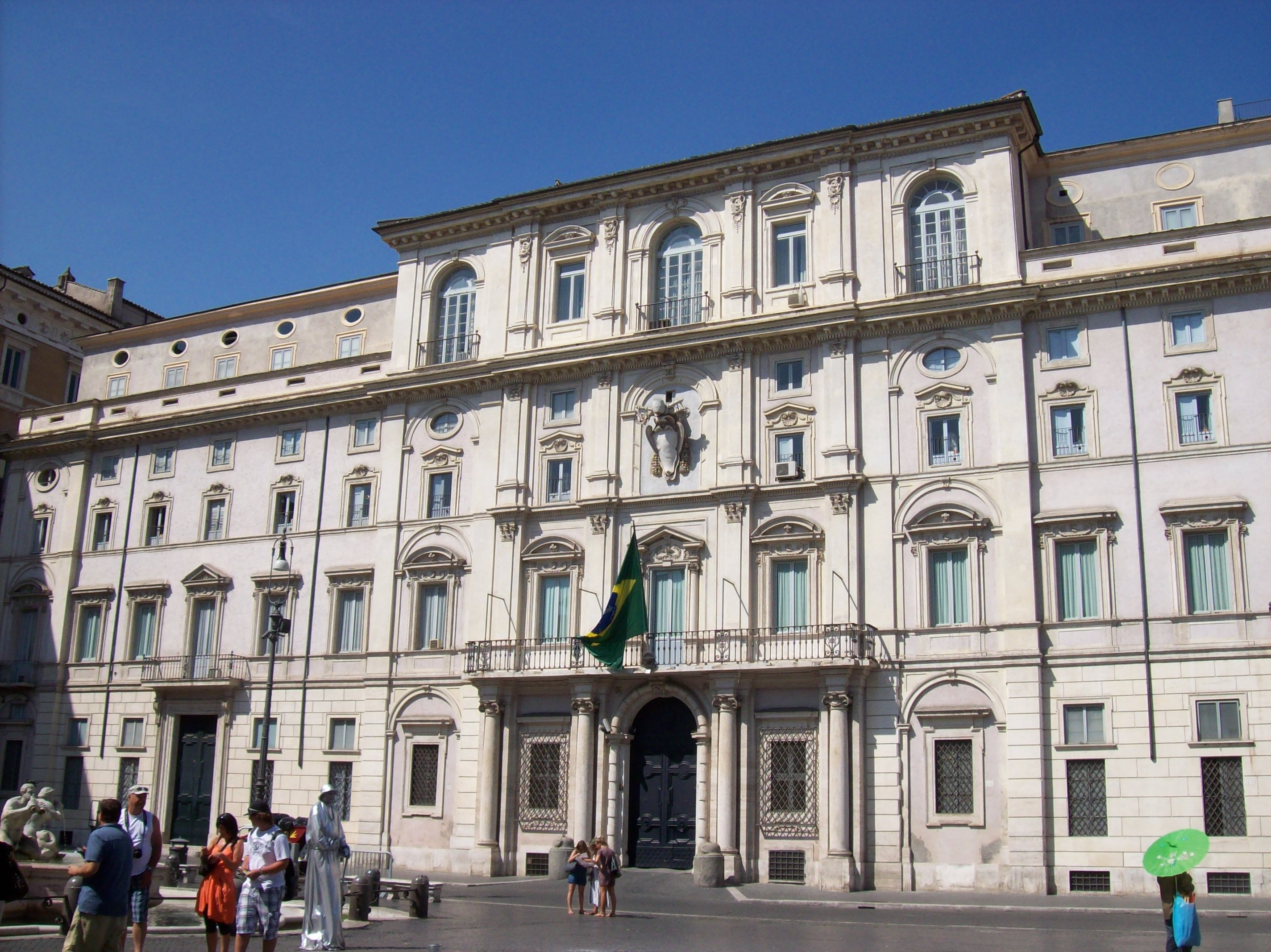
- Click on the map for a fullscreen view

General information
- Location: Rome, Italy
- Coordinates: 41°53′54″N 12°28′22″E
- Construction started: 1644

Design and construction
- Architect: Girolamo Rainaldi

See also Palazzo Doria Pamphilj and Pamphilj Palace (Albano)

Palazzo Pamphilj, also spelled Palazzo Pamphili, is a palace facing onto the Piazza Navona in Rome, Italy. It was built between 1644 and 1650.

Since 1920, the palace has housed the Brazilian Embassy in Italy. In October 1960, it became the property of the Federative Republic of Brazil in a purchase negotiation led by Ambassador Hugo Gouthier de Oliveira Gondim. The roof terrace is open to the public, with a renowned restaurant and bar that showcases the Roman skyline, and frequent concerts, often featuring Italian opera.

== History ==
In 1644, Cardinal Giambattista Pamphilj of the powerful Pamphilj family, who already owned a palace between the Piazza Navona and the Via Pasquino, became Pope Innocent X. With this election came the desire for a larger more magnificent building to reflect his family's increased prestige. Further land was bought, the architect Girolamo Rainaldi received the commission and construction began in 1646. The new project was to incorporate some existing buildings, including the former palace of the Pamphilj (whose decoration by Agostino Tassi was partially preserved) and the Palazzo Cibo. The building work was overseen and managed by Pope Innocent X:s sister-in-law, Olimpia Maidalchini. While the Pope had his apartment facing the Piazza Navona, Olimpia had her apartment on the opposite side facing the Piazza di Pasquino - both with a direct connection to the huge gallery going through the whole width of the building.

In 1647, the Baroque architect Francesco Borromini was consulted about the design and he made a series of new proposals for the palace. However, the prevailing preference was for Rainaldi's more staid and conservative design. Borromini's limited contributions included the stucco decoration of the salone (the main room) and design of the Gallery, located at first floor level between the rest of the palace and the church of St. Agnese next door. The Gallery extends through the width of the block with a large Serliana window at either end.

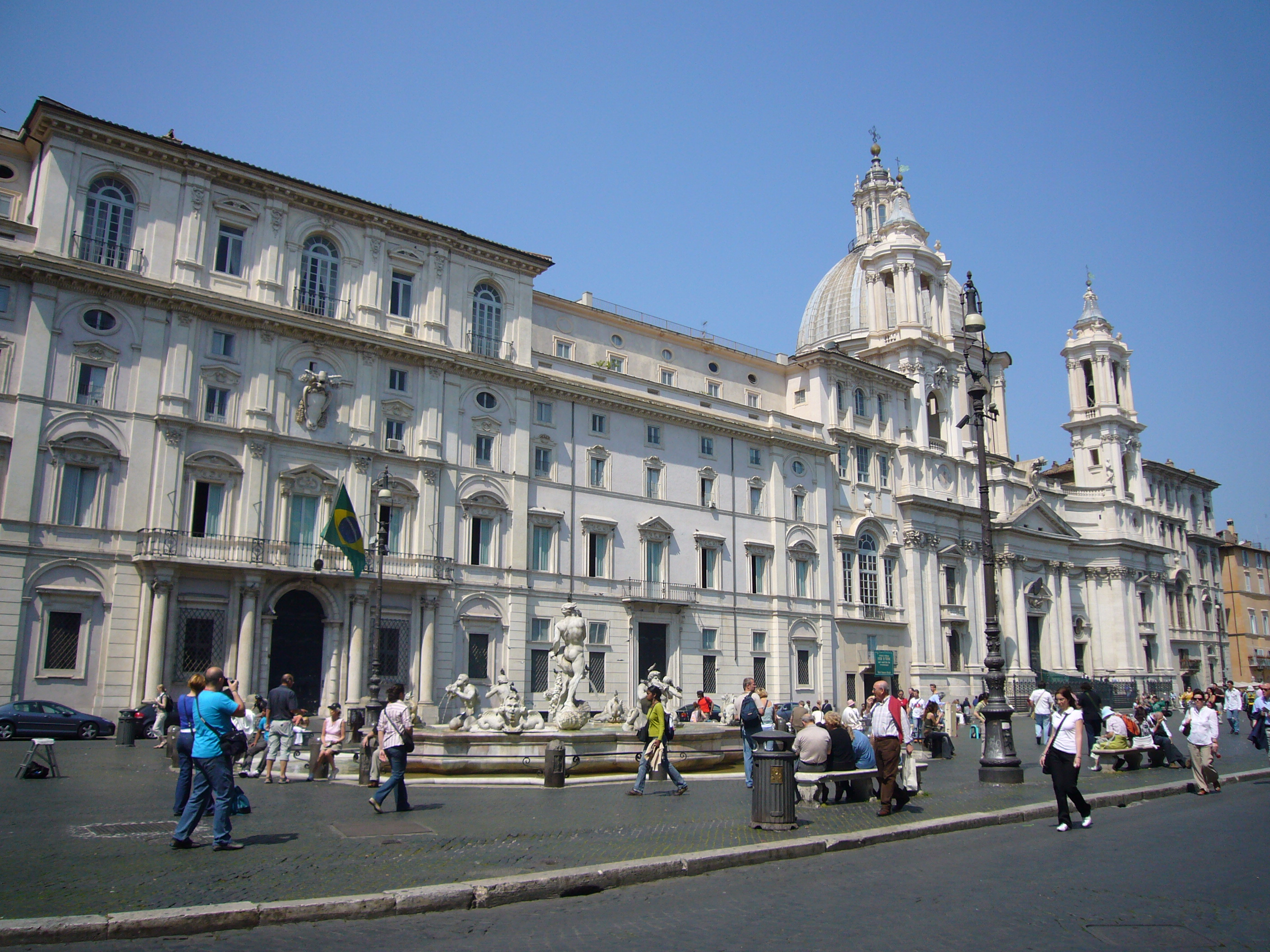
Palazzo Pamphilj on the left, with Sant'Agnese in Agone church on the right, and Fontana del Moro in the foreground. The Serlian windows adjacent to the church open to the Cortona-frescoed gallery.

Between 1651 and 1654, the painter Pietro da Cortona was commissioned to decorate the Gallery vault. His secular fresco cycle depicts scenes from the life of Aeneas, the legendary founder of Rome, as recounted by Virgil. The Pamphili claim to be descended from Aeneas. Unlike the large spacious volume of the Palazzo Barberini in which he had painted his fresco celebrating the reign of Innocent's predecessor, Urban VIII Barberini, the Pamphilj Gallery was long with a low vault which meant that a single viewpoint to see the frescoes was not possible. So Cortona devised a series of scenes around a central painted framed ‘Apotheosis of Aeneas’ into the Olympian heavens. The elaborate doorframes regularly spaced along the longer walls of the Gallery display a combination of motifs typically used by Borromini and by Cortona

The plan has three courtyards. The rooms on the piano nobile (the first floor) have frescoes and friezes by artists such as Giacinto Gimignani, Gaspard Dughet, Andrea Camassei, Giacinto Brandi, Francesco Allegrini, and Pier Francesco Mola.

Carlo Rainaldi, the son of Girolamo, completed the building around 1650.

The new palazzo was also the home of Innocent's widowed sister-in-law Olimpia Maidalchini, who was his confidante and advisor and, more scurrilously, reputed to be his mistress. She was the mother of Camillo Pamphilj, the one time cardinal, who through his marriage came into the possession of the Palazzo Aldobrandini, now known as the Palazzo Doria Pamphilj.

Confusingly, until the unification of the Doria and Pamphilj surnames both palazzi were known as Palazzo Pamphilj, or in the case of today's Doria Pamphilj sometimes "Palazzo Pamfilio". Both spellings Pamphilj and Pamphili are in common Italian usage, even though the family prefers Pamphilj.

== Bibliography ==
Leonie Stephanie. The Palazzo Pamphilj in Piazza Navona: Constructing Identity In Early Modern Rome (Studies in Baroque Art), 2008, Harvey Miller. Magnuson Torgil. Rome in the Age of Bernini, volume II, Almquist & Wiksell, Stockholm, 1986, Chapter 1 Innocent X (1644-1655)

Preceded by Quirinal Palace	Landmarks of Rome; Palazzo Pamphilj	Succeeded by Palazzo Poli
