= Antonio Licata =

Italian painter (1810–1892)

Antonio Licata (3 January 1810 - 27 June 1892) was an Italian painter, mainly of sacred subjects and portraits.

== Biography ==
Licata was born in Agrigento, Sicily. At the age of 16 years, he moved to Naples, where he planned to enrol in the military; however, he chose to become a painter. His portrait of his parents convinced them to sponsor his education at the Neapolitan Academy of Fine Arts. He subsequently obtained a stipend to study at the Accademia di San Luca in Rome.

During a trip to Venice, he met the painter Orsola Faccioli, who became his wife, and moved with him south to live in and around Naples.

The Pinacoteca di Capodimonte held two of his works: San Paolo che accusa il Mago Elima, awarded a gold medal; and Galileo, commissioned by King Vittorio Emanuele. At the Reggia of Naples, his painting of the Angel of Peace was displayed; it had previously been exhibited at Rome. In the church of the Minori conventuali in Catania, he displayed a large Immaculate Conception. In the Palace of Caserta was found a Jesus blessing the children. In the church of the Ascension at Naples, Licata painted the four evangelists; in the chapel of the Immacolata are three half-size figures in oil of Saints Joseph, Francis of Paola, and Mark. For the church of Santo Stefano of Piacenza, he painted a Santa Barbara with Angels; for the University of Catania, A wounded Gladiator that won the gold medal at Naples; and at Palo in the province of Bari, Flight to Egypt, which won a gold medal. In the Chapel of the Duchess of Berry e Gratz : a life-size Santa Rosalia and an Addolorata, a canvas of The beheading of St John the Baptist and some portraits.

In 1869, Licata was named professor of the Institute of Fine Arts of Naples, and instructor of figure at the Royal Educatorio, honorary associate of the Academy of Perugia, Naples, Urbino, and others.
