= Latium (1669) =

1669 work by Athanasius Kircher

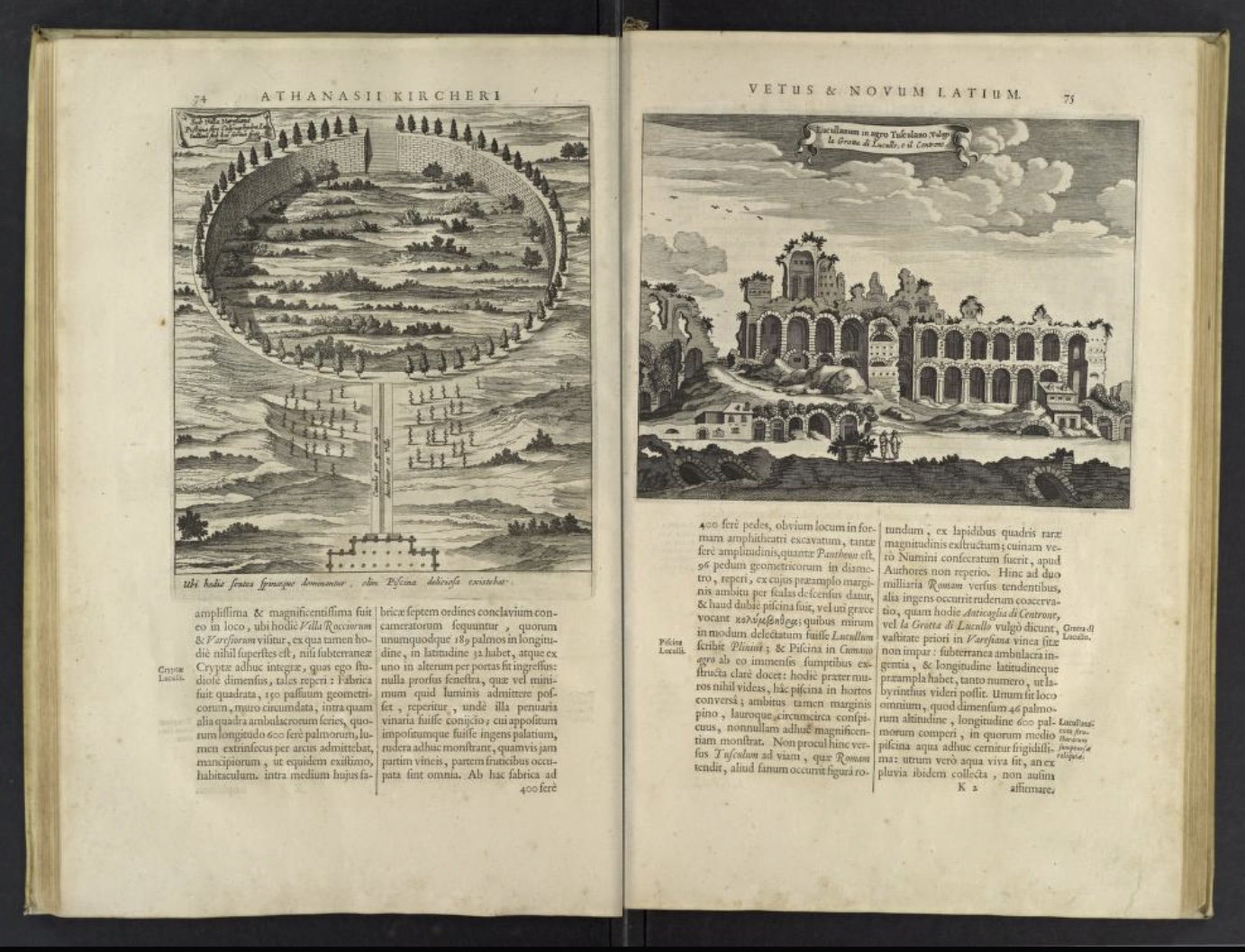
Pages from ‘Latium’ by Athanasius Kircher (1671)

Latium is a 1669 work by the Jesuit scholar Athanasius Kircher. It was dedicated to Pope Clement X and a 1671 edition was published in Amsterdam by Johannes van Waesbergen. The work was the first to discuss the topography, archeology and history of the Lazio region. It was based partly on Kircher's extensive walks in the countryside around Rome, although it included sites that he had probably not visited in person. The work included many illustrations of the contemporary countryside, as well as reconstructions of ancient buildings. It also included an account of his discovery of the ruined sanctuary at Mentorella, which he had already recounted in his 1665 work Historia Eustachio Mariana.

== Contents ==
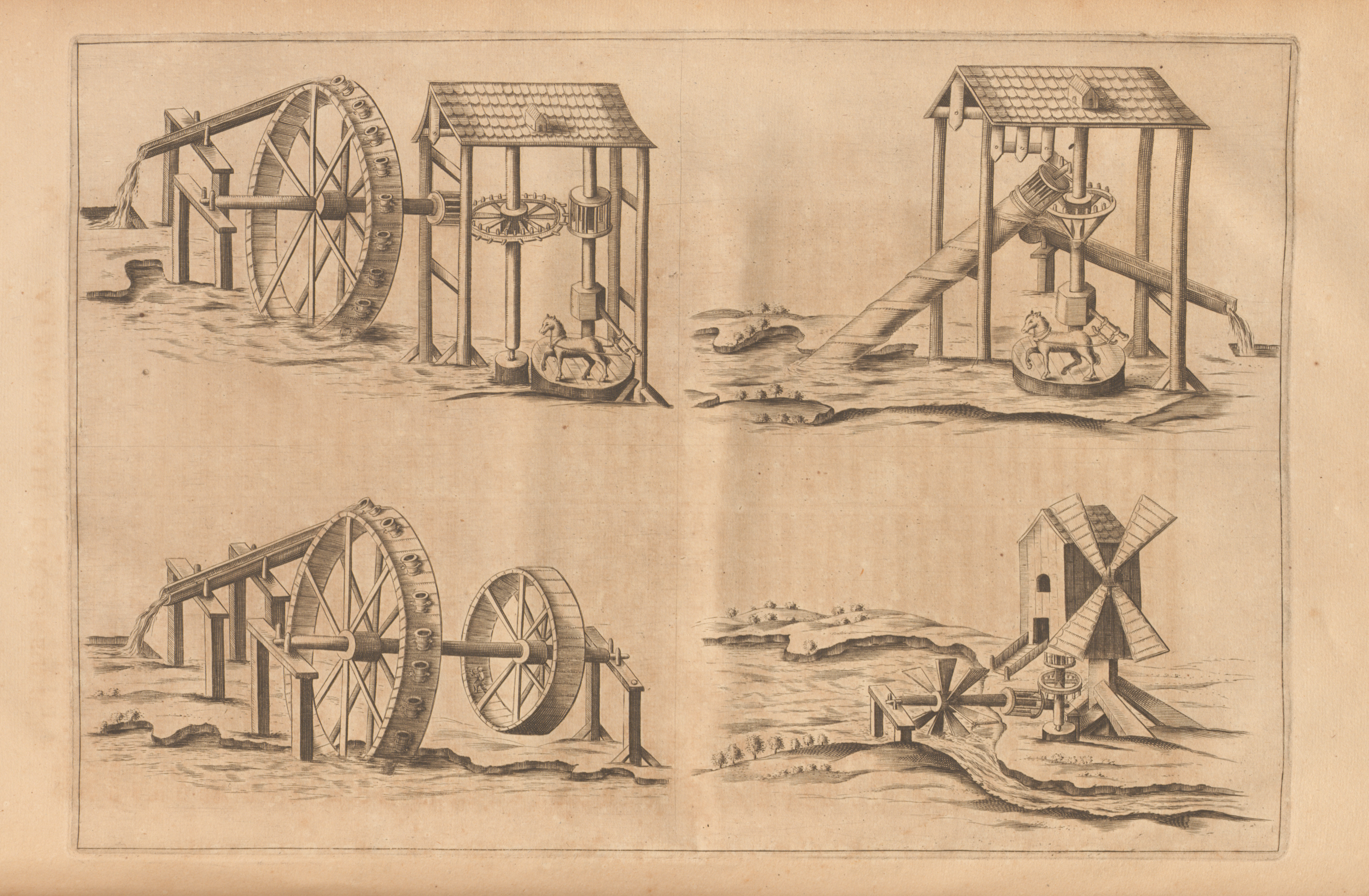
Machinery for draining the Pontine Marshes in Athanasius Kircher's "Latium"

Kircher’s stated purpose in Latium was to use the physical remains of ancient Latium as illustrations of human mutability and transience. It was divided into five books. The first covered the origins and ancient history of the Latins. The second contained chapters describing (I) the region of Monte Cavo, Lake Albano and the ancient town of Alba Longa; (II) Tusculum; (III) the ancient Praeneste and the modern town of Palestrina, and (IV) the region of Labici and the ancient Hernici tribe. The third book examined the ancient history of Tivoli and the fourth, the countryside and ancient remains around it. The fifth book was devoted to the Pontine marshes. The Pontine Marshes to the southeast of Rome had been discussed by Kircher in his 1658 work Scrutinium Physico-Medicum because they were a source of malaria that prevented the agricultural development of the neighbouring region and imposed a heavy burden of disease on its population. Kircher was probably one of the first people to recommend the taking of quinine in Rome to counter malaria. Pope Urban VIII had brought in the Dutch engineer De Wit to begin draining the marshes and in Latium Kircher noted these efforts approvingly, illustrating the devices used to pump out the water.

== Ancient history of Latium ==
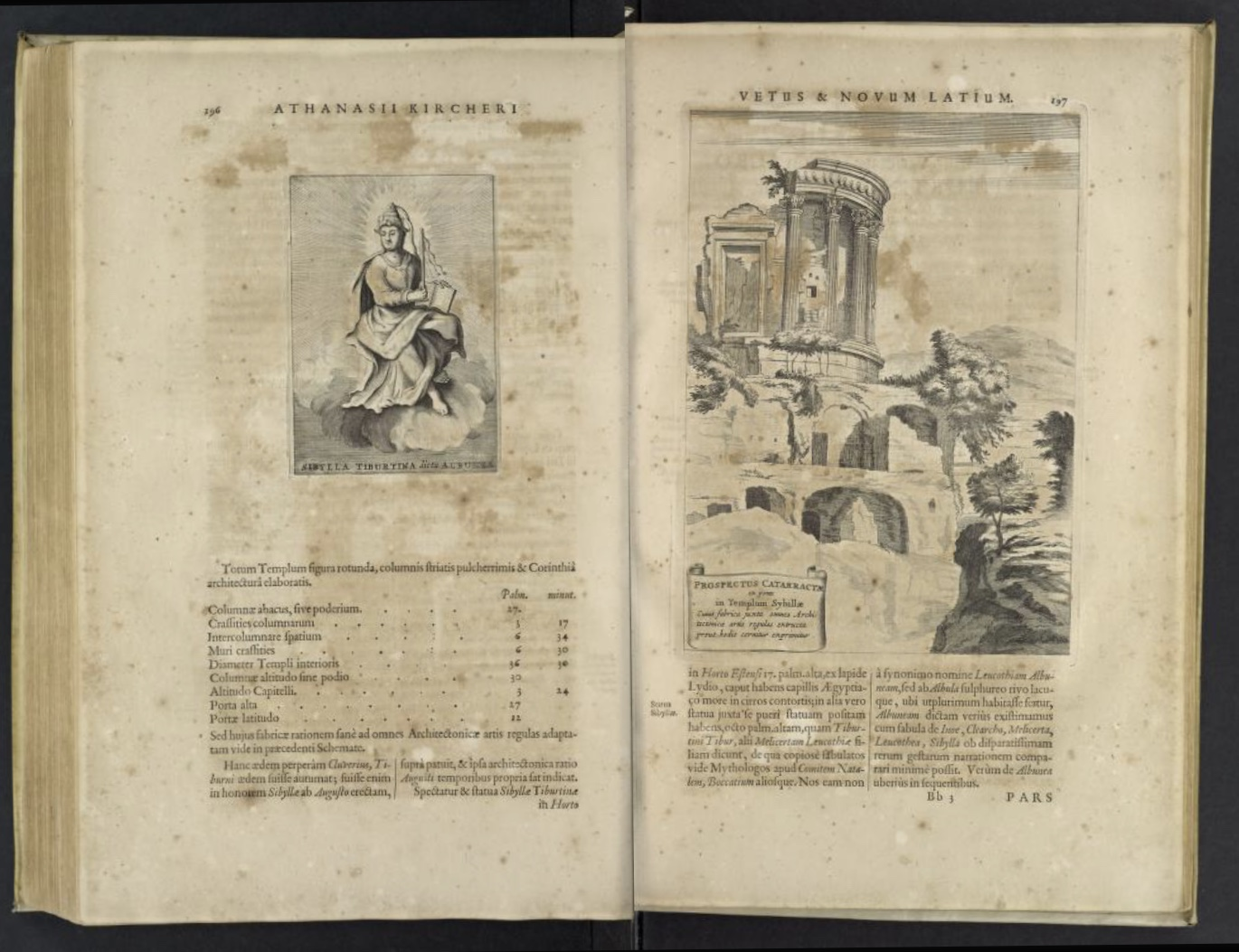
Pages from ‘Latium’ by Athanasius Kircher (1671)

In Book I, Kircher advanced the theory that Latium had been populated after the time of the Tower of Babel, or possibly before. Indeed he held that it had originally been settled by Noah, and that this was supported by local legends about Saturn and Janus, who he believed were in fact Noah himself. Thus, he held, the mythological account of the castration of Saturn was a variant of the Biblical story of the discovery of Noah's nakedness by Ham. Such speculative theories were to be developed in his later works Turris Babel and Arca Noë.

During his countryside walks, Kircher was searching for evidence that would allow him to reconstruct the history of the region from its earliest times right up to the pontificate of Pope Alexander VII. Although the timeline he constructed was highly inaccurate, the evidence he gathered was the first attempt at a complete chronological reconstruction of the region’s history.

== The Nile mosaic ==
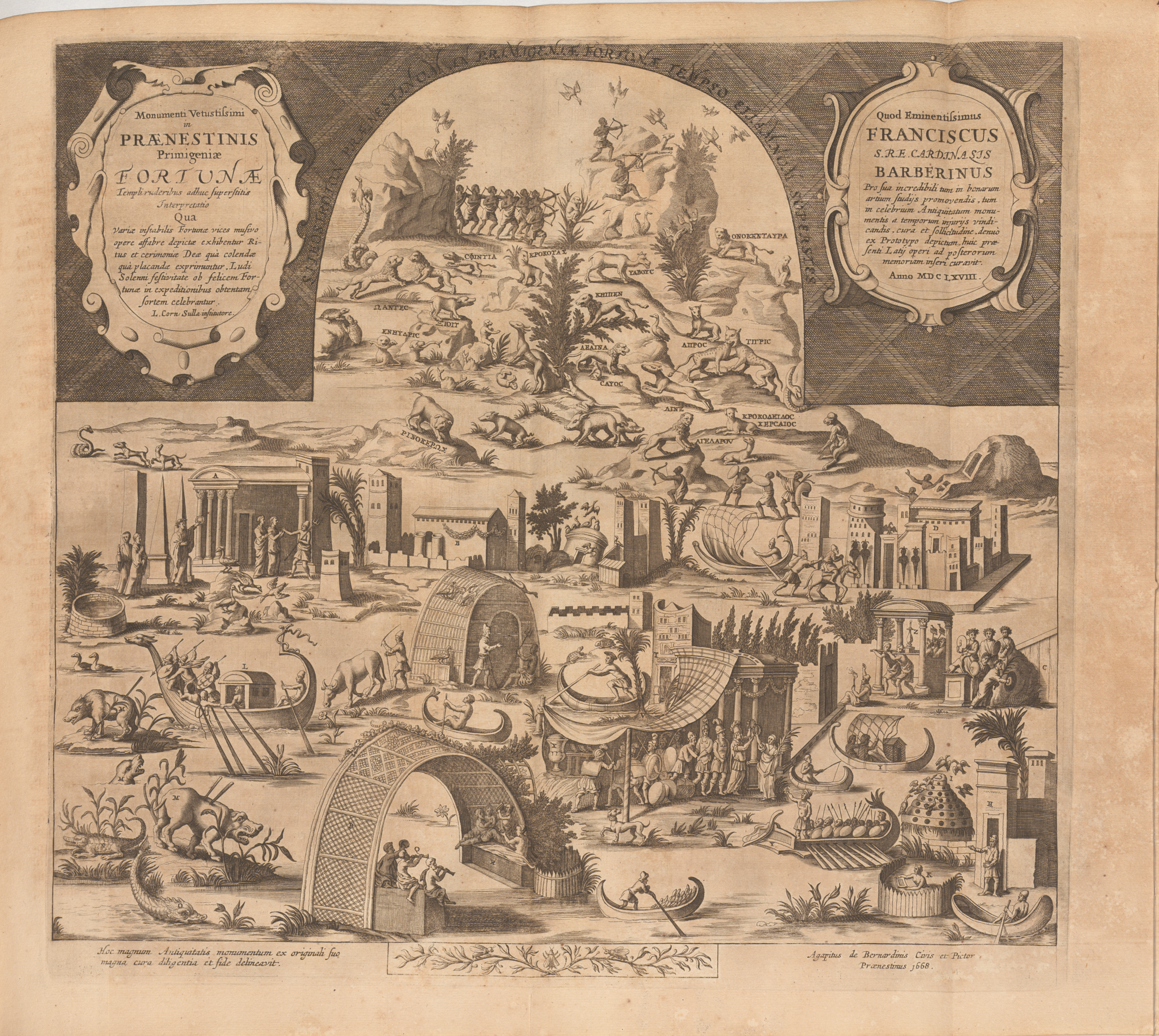
Illustration of the 'Nile mosaic' from Kircher's 'Latium'

Around 1600 a Roman mosaic was discovered at the Temple of Fortuna Primigenia at Praeneste. It is known to modern scholarship as "the Nile mosaic" because it is understood to represent the course of the River Nile from the mountains of Ethiopia through Sudan and Egypt to the sea. However in Book III of Latium Kircher offered a completely different interpretation of the piece, based on the idea that it depicted ceremonies in honour of the goddess of fortune. The upper part, he said, depicted wild animals, representing fortune's dangers. He noted that the people of ancient Praeneste were devotees of Hercules, who was famous for having destroyed monsters and overcome ill fortune. Beneath this, he said, was depicted the veneration of the goddess and consultation of her oracle. He correctly identified the temple of Serapis but this did not serve as a clue of the mosaic's real subject. At the bottom there are festivals and processions in honour of the goddess.

== Illustrations ==
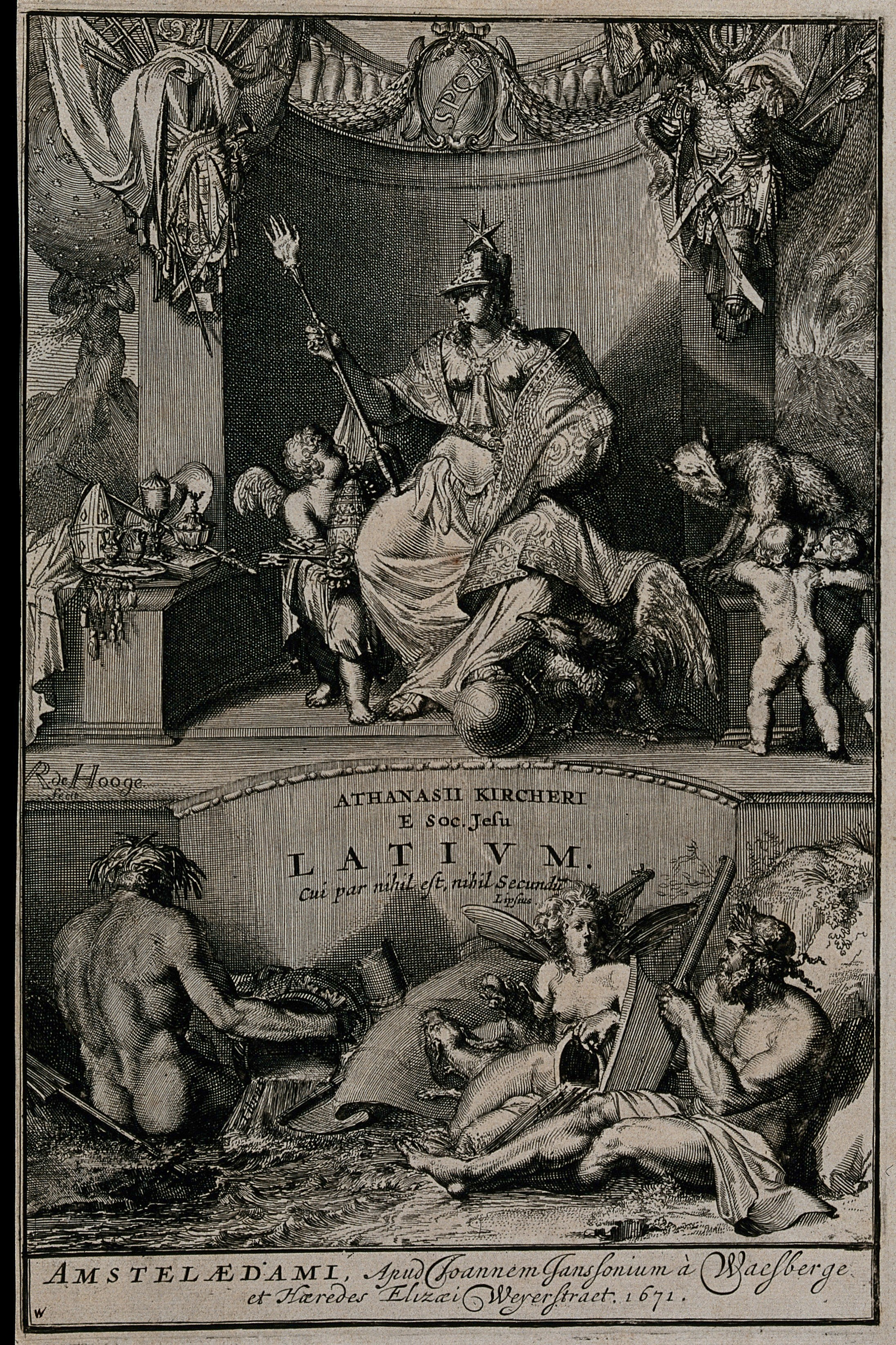
Frontispiece of “Latium” by Athanasius Kircher

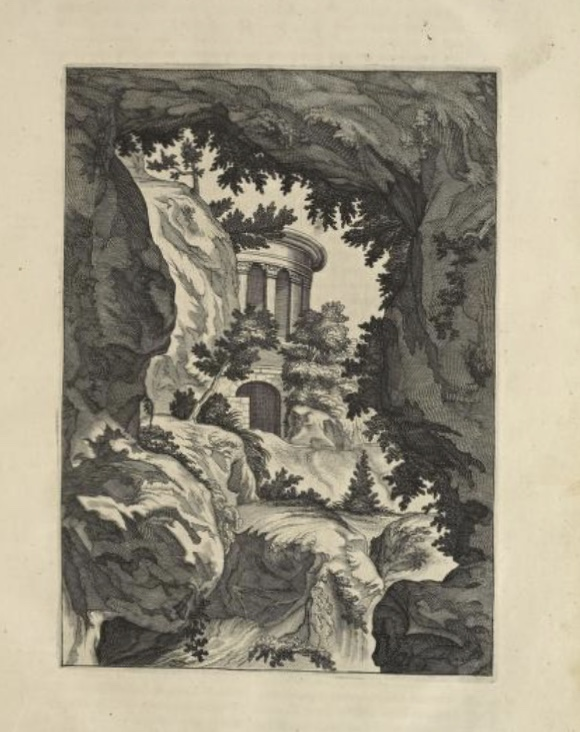
Illustration of the Temple of Vesta, Tivoli from ‘Latium’ by Athanasius Kircher (1671)

Latium was published in folio with 27 engraved plates. These included illustrations, maps, and plans, including 15 double-page foldouts. The illustrations included views of the countryside, sculptures, mosaics, coins and mechanical devices such as watermills.

The frontispiece was by Romeyn de Hooghe. It depicted a seated figure of the genius loci Latia. On one side of her stands a mountain on which Atlas hold up the world, and on the other figures a volcano. These emblems represent, perhaps, the temporal and spiritual power of Rome respectively. Above her hang both ancient and contemporary arms. Romulus and Remus and their she-wolf adopted mother play behind her back while a putto presents her with the papal tiara and the keys of Saint Peter. She is wearing regalia that show that her presence and her power are intimately connected with the Catholic Church. Her crown identifies her as the protector of a city, and the star above it is the symbols of the Chigi family to which Pope Alexander VII belonged. She holds a long sceptre topped with the hand of justice and her eyes fall on a mitre, a cardinal's hat, and other Catholic religious objects. Her robe covers the imperial eagle and her foot rests on the orb of temporal power, indicating her primacy over the Holy Roman Emperor. Beneath Latia is inscribed the Latin motto 'Latium cui par nihil est, nihil Secundu' ('Latium, to which none is equal, and second to none'). At the bottom of the illustration the male figures are the gods of the river Tiber and its Tivoli tributary the Aniene. The female figure with butterfly wings is the goddess of the Aniene, otherwise Ino, resting on symbols of her mythological shipwreck.

The imagery of the frontispiece was intended to emphasise the purpose of Kircher’s claim that his contemporary Rome was connected not just to the ancient city that preceded it, but to a both the ancient classical and biblical worlds. The figure of Latia was Etruscan, the sceptre she hold resembled the regalia of ancient Egypt, while Greece was represented by the winged figure of Ino.

The illustration depicting the apotheosis of Homer was signed by Giovanni Battista Galestruzzi. The aerial view of Palestrina and the plate of the Nile mosaic were signed by Agapito de Bernardini. The maps in the book were the work of Innocenzo Mattei. The book also reused a number of earlier illustrations from previously published works, by Étienne Dupérac, Daniele Stoopendahl and Matteo Greuter. The image of the reconstruction of Hadrian’s villa was a replica of the illustration by Francesco Contini and the image of the temple of Fortune was a replica of a piece by Domenico Castelli.

== Critical reception ==
The work was criticised by many scholars of Kircher’s time for its inaccuracies and speculations about ancient history. Raffaello Fabretti pointed out that Kircher’s text was full of mistakes, his images of aqueducts were inaccurate and his map wrongly located the source of the Aqua Virgo near Colonna. Kircher intended to write a similar work on Etruria, entitled Iter Etruscum, but this was never published, because the Jesuit censors would not approve it.
