= Vacone =

- Comune
- Comune di Vacone
- Location within Italy Location within Lazio
- Coordinates: 42°23′N 12°39′E
- Country: Italy
- Region: Lazio
- Province: Province of Rieti (RI)

Area
  - Total: 9.1 km^{2} (3.5 sq mi)
- Elevation: 517 m (1,696 ft)

Population (2018-01-01)
  - Total: 240
  - Density: 26/km^{2} (68/sq mi)
- Time zone: UTC+1 (CET)
  - Summer (DST): UTC+2 (CEST)
- Website: Official website

Vacone is a comune (municipality) in the Province of Rieti in the Italian region of Latium, located about 20 kilometres (12 mi) west of Rieti.

The parish church, San Giovanni Evangelista is dedicated to St John the Evangelist.

An elaborate ancient Roman villa has been excavated nearby dating from the 2nd century BC.

== Roman villa of Vacone ==
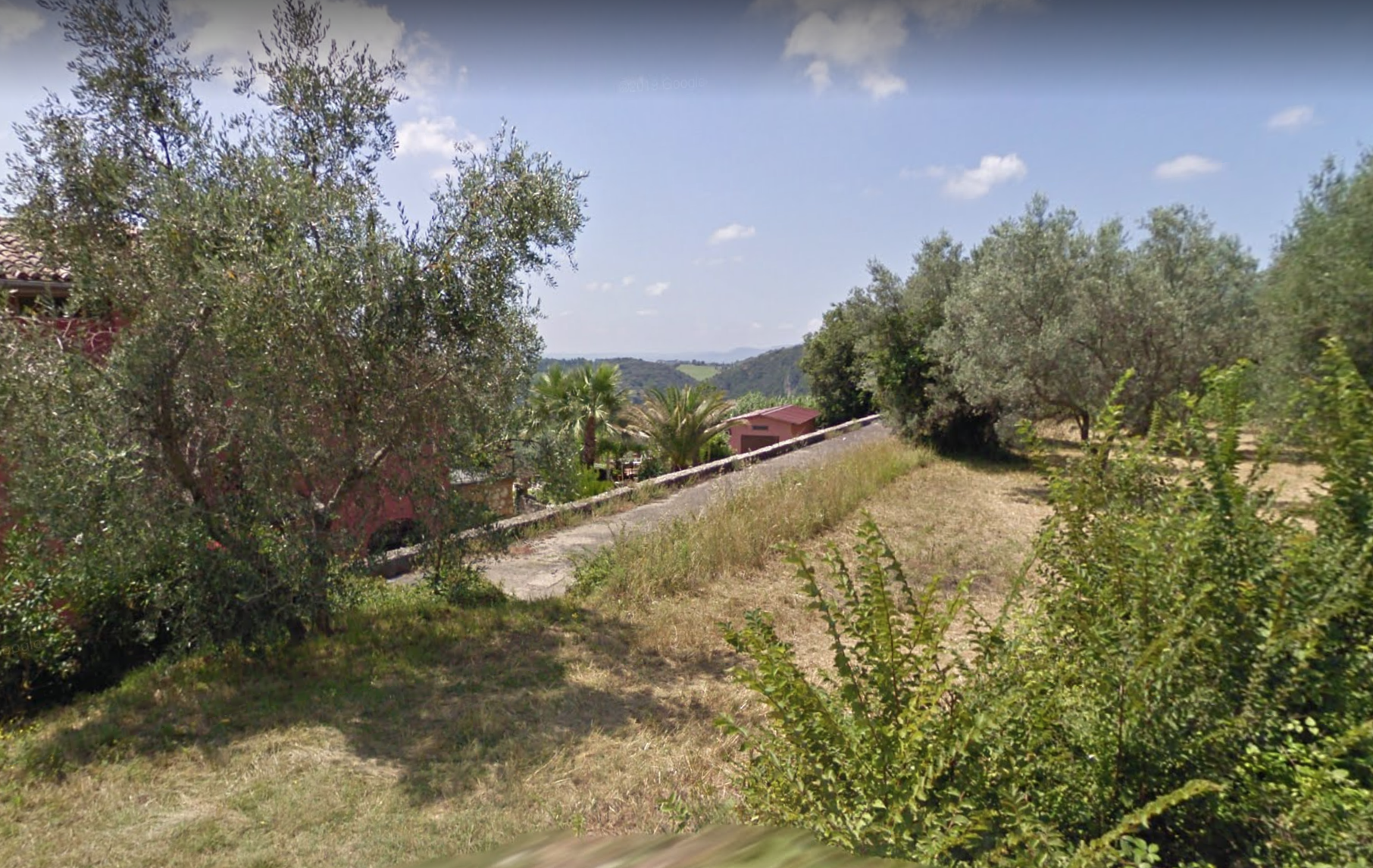
View from lower Cryptoporticus

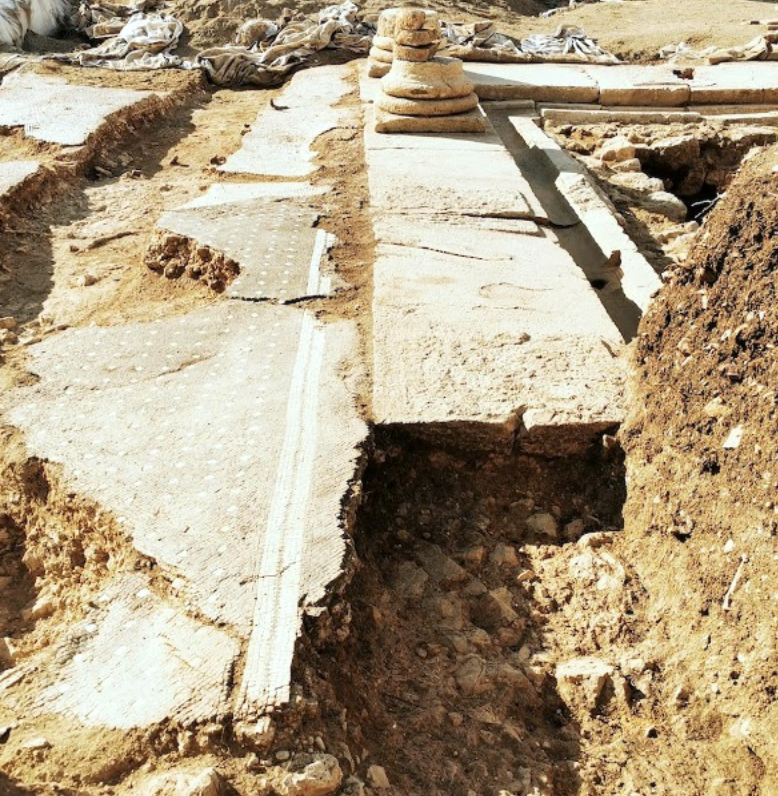
Roman villa of Vacone

=== Background ===
The villa is one of the numerous Roman villas in the Sabina area. The landowners at this time no longer lived in these properties all year, but spent their holidays there in luxury and with many of the comforts of city life. Roman aristocrats often owned several of these villas in Italy, and visited each over the year to check on business and also to enjoy hunting, reading, writing and the rural life. The farms on these estates typically produced lucrative crops that were sold to the cities including olives, grapes (for wine), and even game or other edible luxuries such as snails, fish, and small birds.

=== The site ===
The villa was built on large terraces created on the slope of Monte Cosce supported by two cryptoportici to give magnificent views over the region and the valley of the river Aia, and emphasise its grandeur to visitors. The villa was known from the 15th to the 18th century AD from travellers accounts when it was known as that of Horace. It was forgotten again until the 1970s when the site was rediscovered during roadworks when it was excavated, with more investigation and restoration following in the 1980s, and again in 2012–18.

Two cryptoportici, series of vaulted arches, still exist supporting the terraces, the lower one for the residential area of the villa. The upper terrace had farm buildings northeast of the villa where at least two olive presses were found with brick-lined channels to drain the olive oil into a row of 3 vats, used to separate the oil from byproducts. A basin for collecting grape juice after pressing was also found.

At least 40 rooms belonging to the imperial Roman phase (post 30 BC) have been identified, most being residential with mosaic floors and painted wall plaster. A series of reception rooms opened onto a central peristyle with 5 x 5 columns arrangement, along with additional reception rooms at the back of the villa, bedrooms, and workshops.

Wall frescoes had a variety of designs, such as a unique ring pattern and bird and plant-like motifs. Some rooms also had moulded stucco embellishing walls and ceilings. The 30 mosaic floors are well preserved and include some 16 polychrome mosaics and 7 monochrome. Repairs were made to many of the mosaic floors in antiquity; for example, a large area of damage to opus scutulatum in Room 8 was replaced by red and white tesserae arranged as in the original pattern.

In recent centuries deep holes had been dug through the mosaic floors of the 1st or 2nd century AD in several areas possibly for vines. Excavations within these holes allowed earlier layers to be seen, for example an earlier floor in opus scutulatum (larger coloured marble pieces set into monochrome tesserae or other types of plain pavement) is in Room 3 which dates it to around 100 BC.

The villa may have gone out of use as early as 200 AD on coin and pottery evidence. New walls were built in a later century on different orientations from the earlier walls, and many of these through the mosaic floors. Later still the rooms were used for human burials, including 4 male adults in their 30s, a young child and a newborn.

== Demographic evolution ==
Historical population

Year	Pop.	±%
1861	304	—
1871	358	+17.8%
1881	410	+14.5%
1901	496	+21.0%
1911	510	+2.8%

Year	Pop.	±%
1921	459	−10.0%
1931	462	+0.7%
1936	452	−2.2%
1951	414	−8.4%
1961	349	−15.7%

Year	Pop.	±%
1971	290	−16.9%
1981	262	−9.7%
1991	265	+1.1%
2001	247	−6.8%

Source: Data from ISTAT
