= Vatronia gens =

Ancient Roman family

The gens Vatronia was an obscure plebeian family of ancient Rome. No members of this gens are mentioned by Roman writers, but a number are known from inscriptions.

== Origin ==
The earliest inscriptions mentioning the Vatronii all came from Praeneste in Latium, where members of this gens appear to have been prominent citizens. The nomen Vatronius belongs to a large class of gentilicia ending in -onius. Most of these were formed from cognomina ending in -o or -onis, but once names of this type had become common, -onius came to be regarded as a regular gentile-forming suffix, and was sometimes applied without any morphological justification. At the same time, many surnames of this type had alternative forms with differing stems. Here the root is Vatrax, a cognomen originally referring to someone with crooked feet. Surnames derived from the physical peculiarities of individuals were quite common.

== Praenomina ==
The praenomina occurring most frequently in the epigraphy of the Vatronii were Gaius, Quintus, and Lucius, all of which were among the most common names at all periods of Roman history. Other names used by members of this gens included Aulus, Gnaeus, Titus, and Vibius, of which only the last was uncommon.

== Members ==
This list includes abbreviated praenomina. For an explanation of this practice, see filiation.

- Gaius Vatronius L. f., named in an inscription from Praeneste in Latium, dating from the middle or late third century BC.
- Gaius Vatronius, one of the praetors at Praeneste, around the third quarter of the second century BC. His colleague was Lucius Orcevius.
- Gnaeus Vatronius, the husband of Geminia, named in an inscription from Praeneste, dating between the late third and the first half of the second century BC.
- Vibius Vatronius, named in an inscription from Praeneste, dating between the late third and the end of the second century BC.
- Graeca Vatronia, named in an inscription from Praeneste, dating from the early second century BC.
- Gaius Vatronius C. l., a freedman, and one of the magisters of the cattle merchants' guild at Praeneste. Together with his colleague, Lucius Mucius, he made an offering to Fortuna Primigenia, at some point between the late second century BC, and the end of Sulla's civil war.
- Lucius Vatronius Q. f. Bolanus, made a first-century BC offering to Fortuna Primigenia at Praeneste.
- Lucius Vatronius Ɔ. l. Suavis, a freedman buried at Rome, in a tomb dating from the first half of the first century.
- Gaius Vatronius C. Ɔ. l. Anteros, the freedman of Gaius Vatronius and Cartilia, one of several freedmen and women named in a sepulchral inscription from Rome, dating from the latter half of the first century.
- Vatronia T. f. Gratilla, buried at the site of modern Cadolino in Italy, aged eight years, ten months, and twenty-three days, in a tomb dating between the latter half of the first century, and the early part of the second, built by her mother, Porcia Primilla.
- Vatronia Fortunata, buried at Hadrumetum in Africa, aged forty, in a tomb dating between the latter half of the second century, and the end of the third.
- Gaius Vatronius Agathamerus, a member of the boatbuilders' guild at Ostia in Latium in AD 152.
- Gaius Vatronius Crescens, a member of the boatbuilders' guild at Ostia in AD 152.
- Gaius Vatronius Junianus, a member of the boatbuilders' guild at Ostia in AD 152.

=== Undated Vatronii ===
- Vatronia, the wife of Lucius, buried at Lambaesis in Numidia, aged thirty.
- Aulus Vatronius A. f. Q. n., named in an inscription from Corinth in Achaia.
- Vatronia Cale, buried at Rome, in a tomb built by Vatronius Venustus. The inscription is thought to be modern.
- Titus Vatronius Modestus, dedicated a tomb at Rome for his wife, Priscilla.
- Quintus Vatronius Q. f. Rogatus, buried at Saldae in Mauretania Caesariensis, aged twenty-three.
- Vatronius Venustus, built a tomb at Rome for Vatronia Cale. The inscription is thought to be modern.

== See also ==
- List of Roman gentes

== Bibliography ==
- Samir Aounallah et al., Inscriptions latines lapidaires du musée de Sousse (Latin Inscriptions in Stone from the Museum of Sousse), Sassari (2019).
- Annalisa Franchi de Bellis, I cippi prenestini (The Grave Markers of Praeneste), Urbino (1997).
- René Cagnat et alii, L'Année épigraphique (The Year in Epigraphy, abbreviated AE), Presses Universitaires de France (1888–present).
- George Davis Chase, "The Origin of Roman Praenomina", in Harvard Studies in Classical Philology, vol. VIII, pp. 103–184 (1897).
- Corinth: The inscriptions 1926–1950, Princeton (1966).
- Attilio Degrassi, Inscriptiones Latinae Liberae Rei Publicae (Latin Inscriptions from the Roman Republic), Florence (1965).
- Epigraphica, Rivista Italiana di Epigrafia (1939–present).
- Rosanna Friggeri and Carla Pelli, Vivo e morto nelle iscrizioni di Roma, Miscellanea, Rome (1980).
- Wilhelm Henzen, Ephemeris Epigraphica: Corporis Inscriptionum Latinarum Supplementum (Journal of Inscriptions: Supplement to the Corpus Inscriptionum Latinarum), Institute of Roman Archaeology, Rome (1872–1913).
- Theodor Mommsen et alii, Corpus Inscriptionum Latinarum (The Body of Latin Inscriptions, abbreviated CIL), Berlin-Brandenburgische Akademie der Wissenschaften (1853–present).
