= Arca Noë =

1675 book by Athanasius Kircher

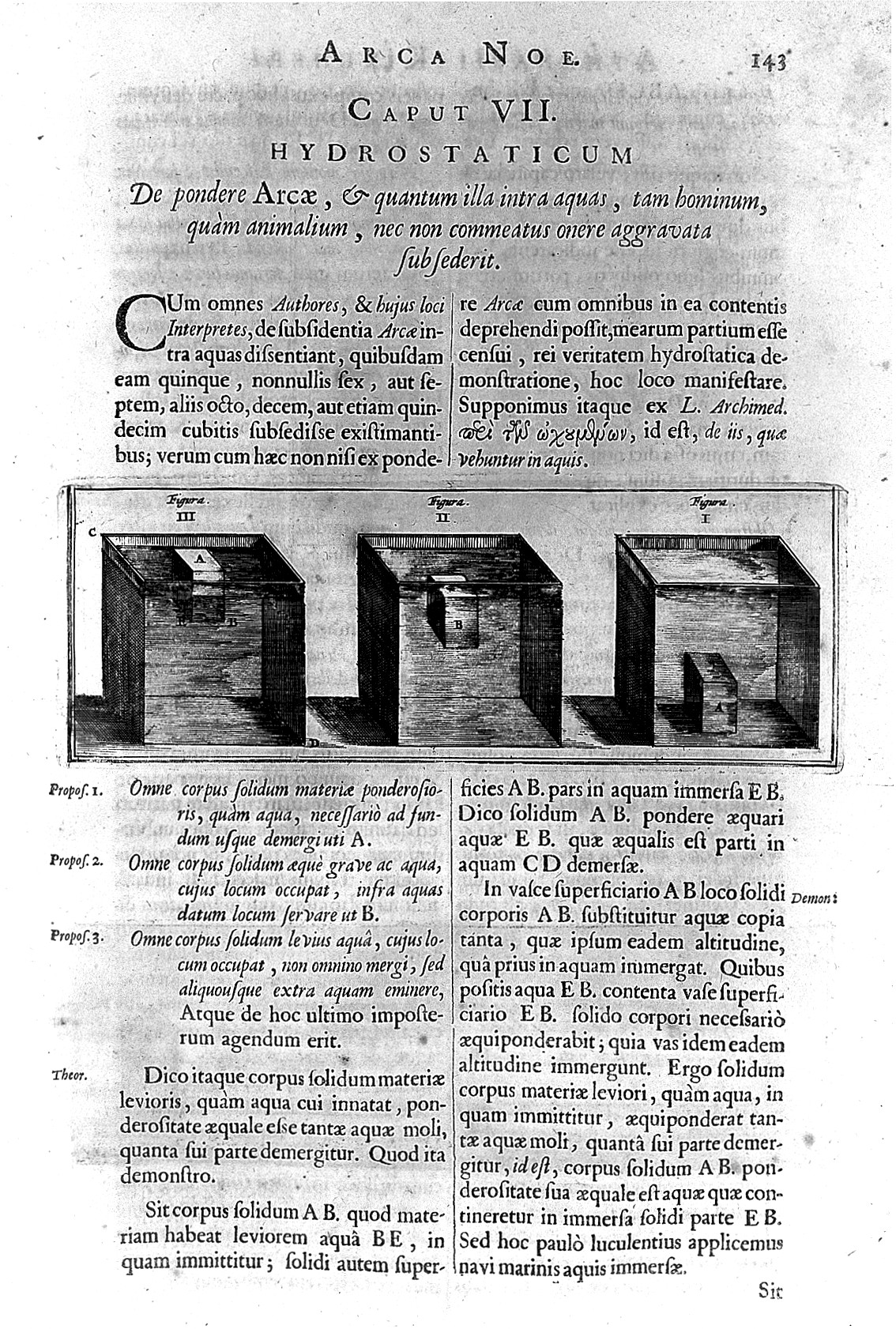
Explanation of why Noah's Ark did not sink, despite its size, from Arca Noë

Arca Noë ("Noah's Ark") is a book published in 1675 by the Jesuit scholar Athanasius Kircher. It is a study of the biblical story of Noah's Ark, published by the cartographer and bookseller Johannes van Waesbergen in Amsterdam. Kircher's aim in Arca Noë was to reconcile recent discoveries in nature and geography with the text of the Bible. This demonstration of the underlying unity and truth between revelation and science was a fundamental task of Catholic scholarship at the time. Together with its sister volume Turris Babel ("The Tower of Babel"), Arca Noë presented a complete intellectual project to demonstrate how contemporary science supported the account of the Book of Genesis.

== Structure ==
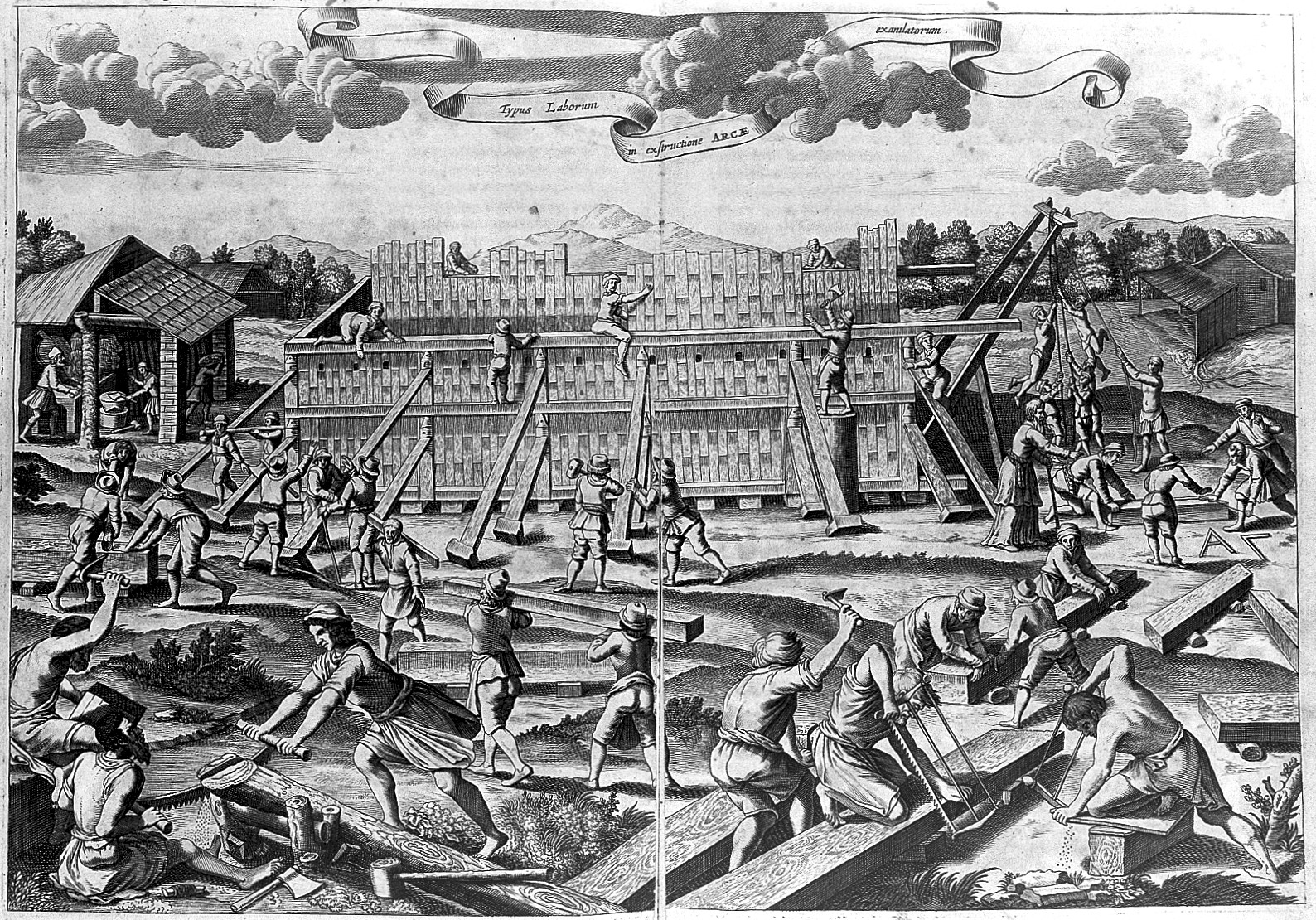
Building the ark, in Arca Noë

The work is divided into three volumes: the first, De rebus quae ante Diluvium, dealt with the story of Noah before the Genesis flood narrative, the building of the Ark, the choice of animals to go on board and how they were accommodated. The second, De iis, quae ipso Diluvio e jusque duratione, concerned the flood itself and how the Ark was managed while the flood lasted, as well as providing a mystical and allegorical explanation of its meaning, as a vessel carrying the human soul. The third volume, De iis, quae post Diluvium a Noëmo gesta sunt, discussed the deeds of Noah after the flood, compared the lands of the world as they had been before it and after, and explained how both people and animals dispersed over the globe.

== Ideas discussed ==
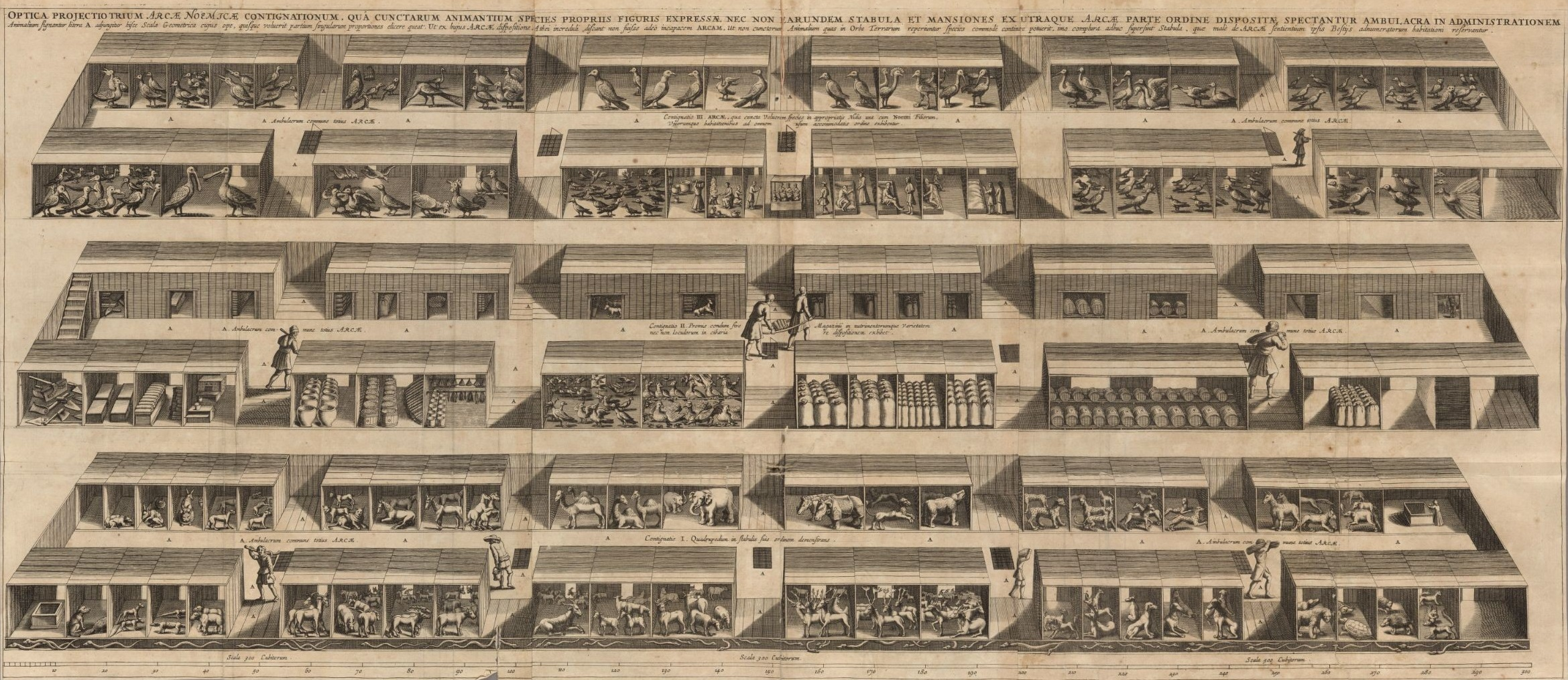
Cutaway view of Noah's Ark, illustration from Arca Noë

By the middle of the seventeenth century, the abundance and diversity of life discovered in the New World was calling into question the previously unchallenged belief that all life on earth originated from a single point of dispersal - Mount Ararat, after the Flood. One of the uncertainties which Kircher addressed in Arca Noë was how animals had managed to colonise lands so distant across the seas. Another, to which he devoted particular attention, was how so many creatures could have fitted into the Ark at all.

Kircher had first discussed the question of the size of the Ark in 1640 during a mathematical convention to celebrate the centenary of the Jesuit order. Here he delivered a technical paper on Noah's Ark, discussing the exact length of a Biblical cubit. In Arca Noë, taking the dimensions given in the Bible, Kircher explained how it was possible that all the animals in the contemporary world could originate from a vessel of such limited size. The Book of Genesis does not identify the animals taken into the Ark, describing them only as both "clean" and "unclean". Kircher therefore speculated about which animals were aboard, how they were accommodated, and used this as a basis for working out how it could have been designed and constructed. He also described details such as the exact year of the Flood (2396 BC), the time between the fall of the first raindrop and Noah setting foot on dry land (365 days), where the Ark landed, and how the creatures spread over the earth after the Flood abated.

Kircher explained that while Noah had built the Ark, the design came directly from God himself, ensuring that its form was thus a concrete manifestation of divine intelligence. Its dimensions served to rule out another matter which the work discussed: the Book of Genesis records that there were giants on planet Earth in ancient history, and some held that Noah himself was one of them. Kircher demonstrated that the size of the Ark made this impossible - there would not have been room for a family of giants on board alongside all the animals. This affirmation of Noah's humanity allowed Kircher to show that the Ark represented not only the human body, vehicle of the living soul, but also symbolised the Christian Church itself, just as Noah prefigured Jesus as a mediator between God and sinful mankind.

== Classification of animals in the ark ==
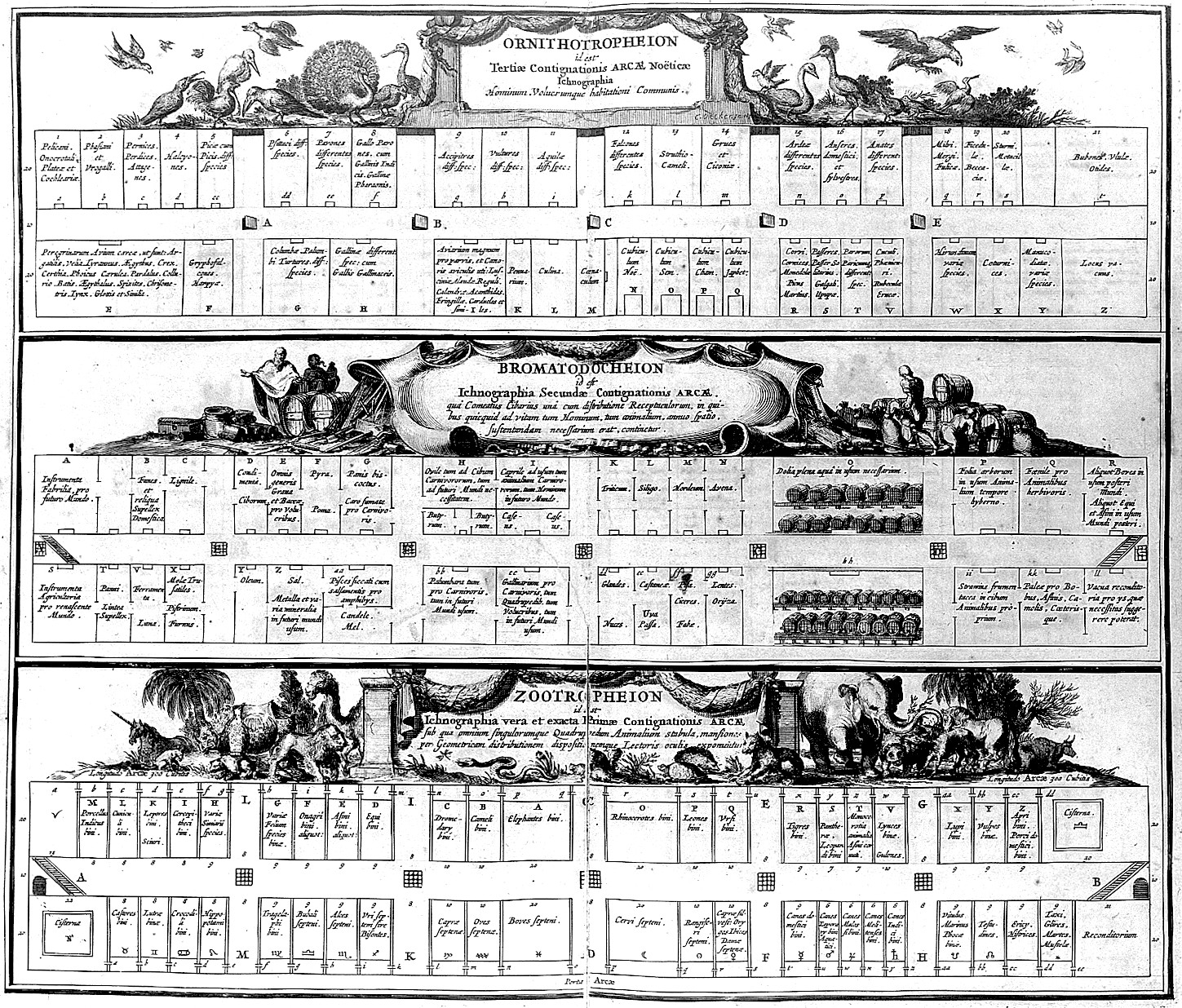
Internal arrangement of the ark, Arca Noë

Kircher sought to account for how different kinds of animal were accommodated in the Ark, and to do this, he classified them, focusing mainly on Old World species. Echoing Pliny, he ignored the taxonomies of his contemporary scholars and simply classified them by size, from the elephant downwards. He went on to explain how they would have been accommodated, with plant-eaters separated from meat-eaters, land-dwellers from amphibians and water creatures, and 'clean' from 'unclean'.

The chart showing the floor plan for the Ark shows how the animals were housed. On the lower deck one side berthed beavers, otters, crocodiles, hippopotami, goat-stags, gazelles, elks, bison, goats, sheep, cattle, deer, reindeer, wild goats, chamois, fallow deer, dogs, aquatic hare-hounds, Molossian hounds, Maltese dogs, Indian dogs, seals, turtles, hedgehogs, porcupines, badgers, dormice, martens and weasels. The other side housed small Indian pigs, rabbits, hares, squirrels, monkeys, apes, cats, asses, donkeys, horses, dromedaries, camels, elephants, rhinoceroses, lions, bears, tigers, panthers, leopards, unicorns, other horned animals from Africa, lynxes, gluttons, wolves, foxes, wild boars and domestic pigs.

The middle deck carried food and supplies both for the voyage and for life after it. On one side were stored agricultural tools, clothes and household linens, metal goods, wool, mills, bread, ovens and a furnace, oil, salt, assorted materials for use after the flood, dried fish and fish preserved in salt water, candles, honey, a dovecote, a chicken coop, acorns, nuts, dried fruit, rice and pulses, casks of water, straw and hay. On the other side were rope and household goods, wood, spices, grains and berries, fruit, bread, smoked meat, a sheep-fold and a goat-fold for feeding the carnivorous animals, butter, cheese, wheat, barley and oats, water, tree-leaves and hay for winter feed, as well as cattle, horses and asses for use after the flood.

The top deck housed the cabins for Noah and his family, and apart from this was given over to birds. On one side were river swallows, kingbirds, tits, corncrakes, creepers, shrikes, gryphon-falcons, harpies, doves, pigeons, chickens and fowl, with an aviary for small songbirds, crows, jackdaws and woodpeckers, sparrows, hoopoes, peacocks, cuckoos, robins, swallows, quail and birds of paradise. On the other side were pelicans, spoonbills, pheasants, grouse, partridge, kingfishers, magpies, parrots, peacocks, turkeys, hawks, vultures, eagles, falcons, ostriches, cranes, storks, herons, geese, ducks, kites, coots, fig-peckers, oyster-catchers, starlings, wagtails, owls and bustards.

== Animals not carried in the ark ==
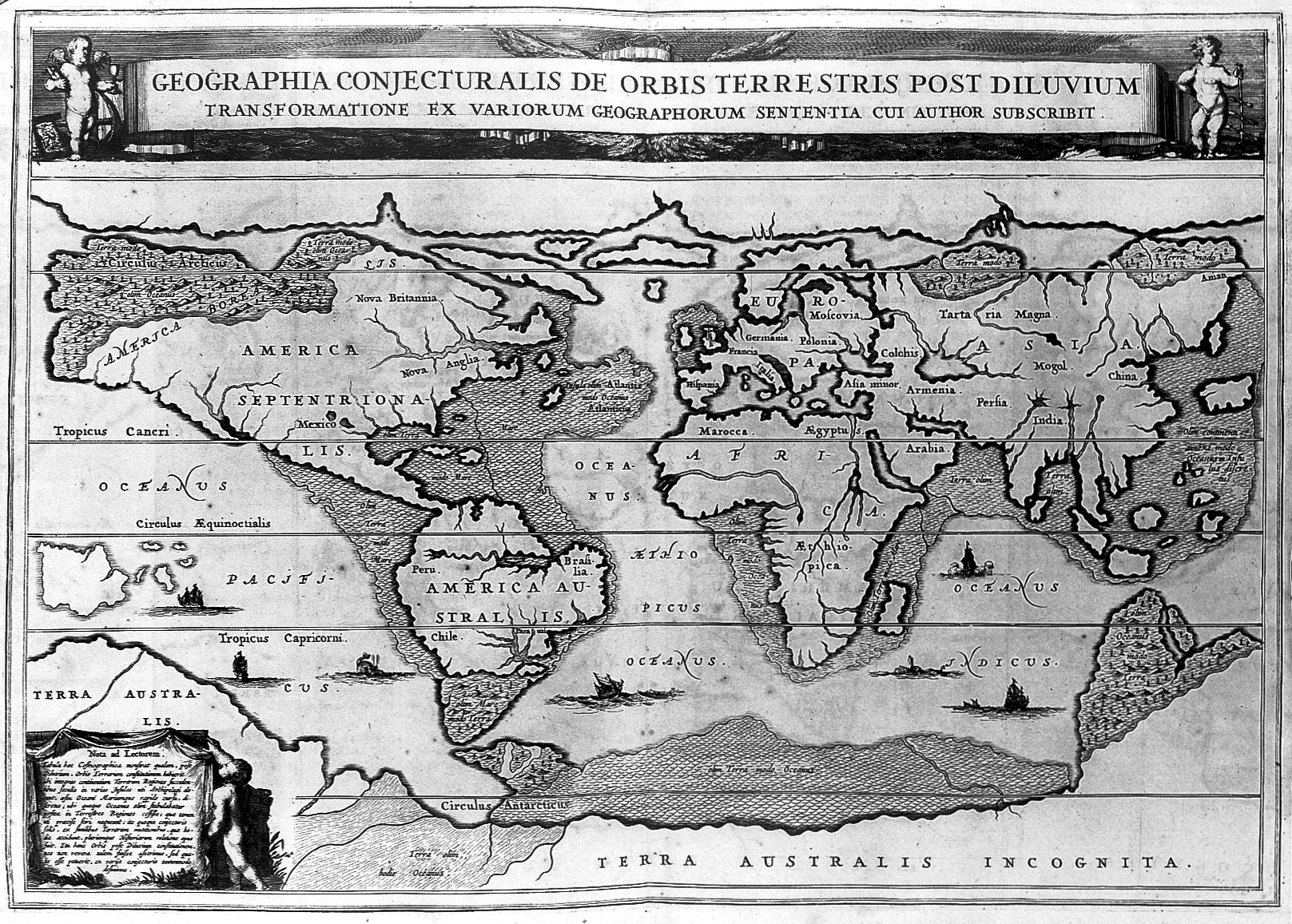
Map of the world in Arca Noë showing how the land area of the world's continents was much larger immediately after the flood

Kircher believed - as did many others at his time - that certain animals did not reproduce sexually, but through spontaneous generation. Such creatures did not need a place in the Ark since they could simply produce themselves from dung or mud. In Kircher's account this included small mammals such as mice and voles, as well as reptiles and insects. Kircher did say that snakes were taken on the Ark, partly because of their unique medicinal value, and partly as food for some of the birds on board.

Kircher also excluded all animals which he regarded as 'hybrid', including the giraffe. These creatures he argued were descended from offspring of different animals carried on the ark which later interbred. He considered the armadillo to be a hybrid of the hedgehog and the turtle, and the alpine marmot to be a mixture of the badger and the squirrel.

Kircher also explained that many of the creatures of the New World did not need to have a place in the Ark. The original creatures of God's creation came from the Garden of Eden and were adapted to its climate; as they spread out over the world after the flood, they adapted to different climates and conditions, evolving over time into the new forms seen today. Through these arguments, Kircher claimed that the Biblical dimensions of the Ark (198 metres long, 33 metres wide and 19.8 metres high) afforded sufficient space to allow the ancestors of all modern creatures in the world to be carried.

== Illustrations ==
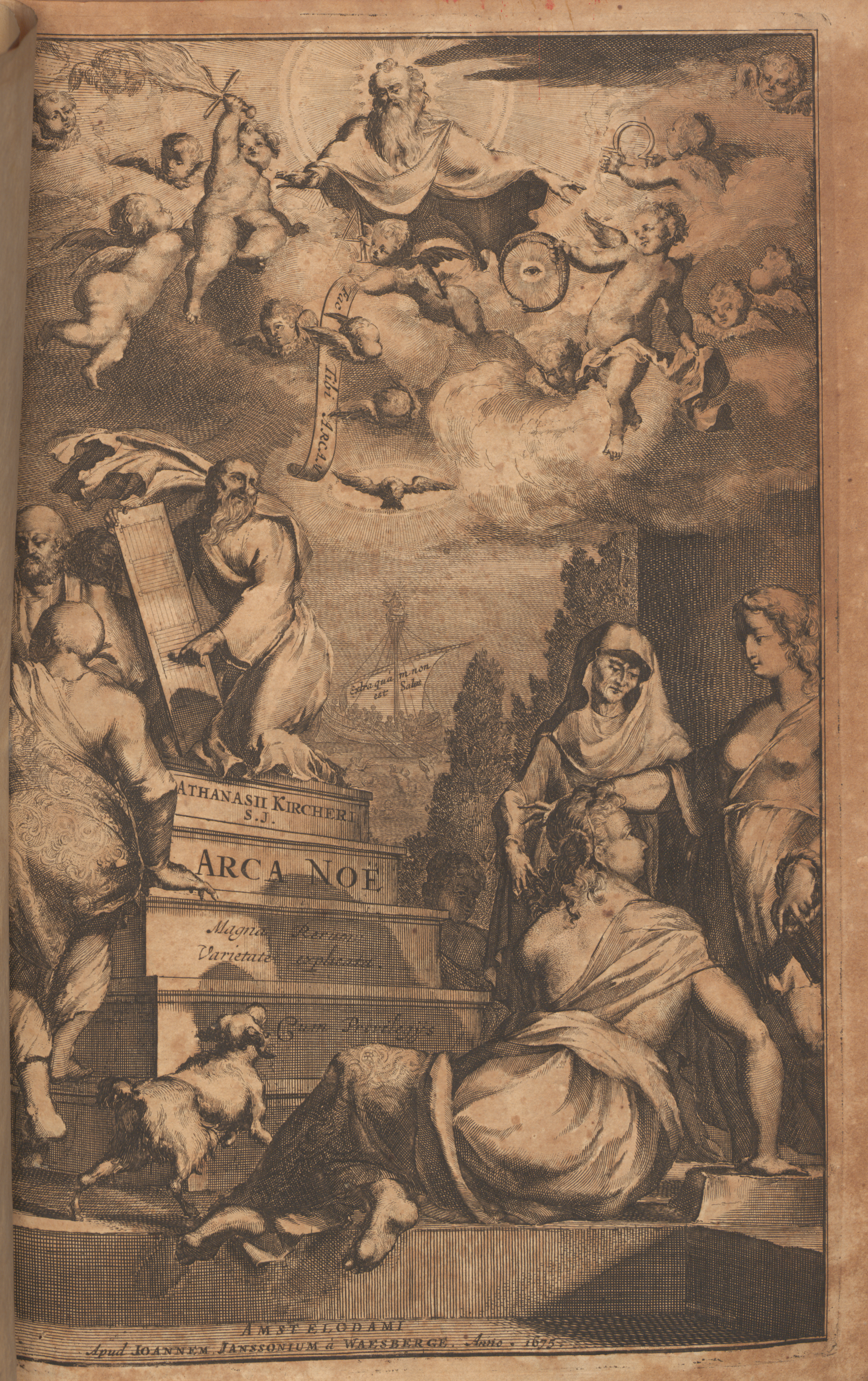
Frontispiece of Athanasius Kircher's "Arca Noë" (1675)

Arca Noë was dedicated to the twelve year-old king Charles II of Spain. Its attractiveness to children has been remarked on, with its lavish illustrations and half-playful tone. The dedication compared Noah's Ark to Charles' empire, pointing out that "what Noah had in a small space, you, High King, possess scattered throughout your realm." Arca Noë included many illustrations, detailing the design and construction of the ark and the animals preserved in it.

The frontispiece depicted God directing putti bearing a flaming sword, alpha and omega, above the dove the Holy Spirit. Beneath them, surrounded by lost souls struggling in the waves to reach it, the Ark is afloat on the Flood, representing the Church with Christ keeping watch in the crow's nest and the words "Extra quam non est salus" ("outside of which there is no salvation") on its sail. The foreground shows Noah and his family giving thanks for their salvation.

The interior of the book contained over 100 woodcut illustrations, including maps, charts and folding diagrams. Three of the finest illustrations were by Coenraet Decker - the portrait of Charles II, Noah and His Progeny, and the Submerged Mountains. Arca Noë also contains the largest illustration contained in any of Kircher's books. This was the cutaway diagram of the interior of the Ark, showing where the animals were housed. Measuring 39 x 17 ½ inches, it was made from three separate plates and folded out of the book. An entire section of the work was devoted to animals Kircher considered to be hybrid. As well as allowing Kircher to minimise the number of animals requiring space on the Ark, these hybrids also provided a good opportunity for including many exotic and fanciful illustrations to attract the interest of the book's young patron.

== Bibliography ==
- Don Cameron Allen, The Arca Noe of Athanasius Kircher in The Legend of Noah: Renaissance Rationalism in Art, Science and Letters, Urbana 1949
- Davis A. Young, The Biblical Flood: A Case Study of the Church's Response to Extrabiblical Evidence, Eerdmans 1995
