= San Giovanni Evangelista, Vacone =

Romanesque-style Roman Catholic parish church

Coordinates: 42°23′04.9″N 12°38′39.8″E

San Giovanni Evangelista is a Romanesque-style Roman Catholic parish church located in the small town of Vacone, in the province of Rieti, region of Lazio, Italy.

== History ==
The church was built alongside the castle guarding the town. A church at the site was built in the 12th century, and underwent a number of refurbishments including a major one in 1539. The apse retains the semicircular architecture typical of Romanesque churches. The facade was decorated with baroque tiles. In a niche near the door is a faint fresco of the Virgin and Child form the 13th-century. The interior has five altars. The Main altarpiece is a triptych attributed to Antoniazzo Romano, depicting the saints John the Evangelist flanked by the Apostle Paul and Proto-martyr St Stephen.

One of the altarpieces depicts the Madonna of the Rosary with Child offering the Crown of the Rosary and Saints Dominic and Catherine. The painting is surrounded by the 15 Mysteries of the Rosary. The design of the painting is attributed to Girolamo Troppa.
