= Turris Babel =

Book by Athanasius Kircher

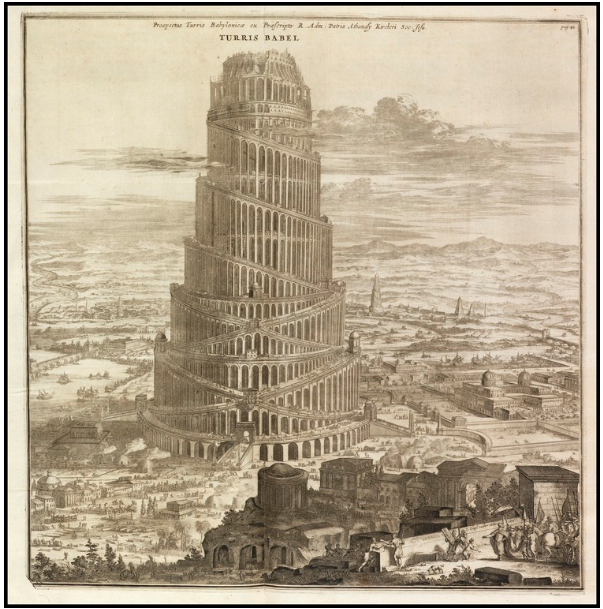
Illustration of the Tower of Babel by Coenraet Decker, after Lieven Cruyl

Turris Babel (The Tower of Babel) is a 1679 work by the Jesuit scholar Athanasius Kircher. It was the last of his books published during his lifetime. Together with his earlier work Arca Noë (Noah's Ark), it represents Kircher's endeavour to show how modern science supported the Biblical narrative in the Book of Genesis. The work was also a broad synthesis of many of Kircher's ideas on architecture, language and religion. The book was dedicated to the Holy Roman Emperor Leopold I and printed in Amsterdam by the cartographer and bookseller Johannes van Waesbergen.

== Book one: the generations between Noah and Nimrod ==
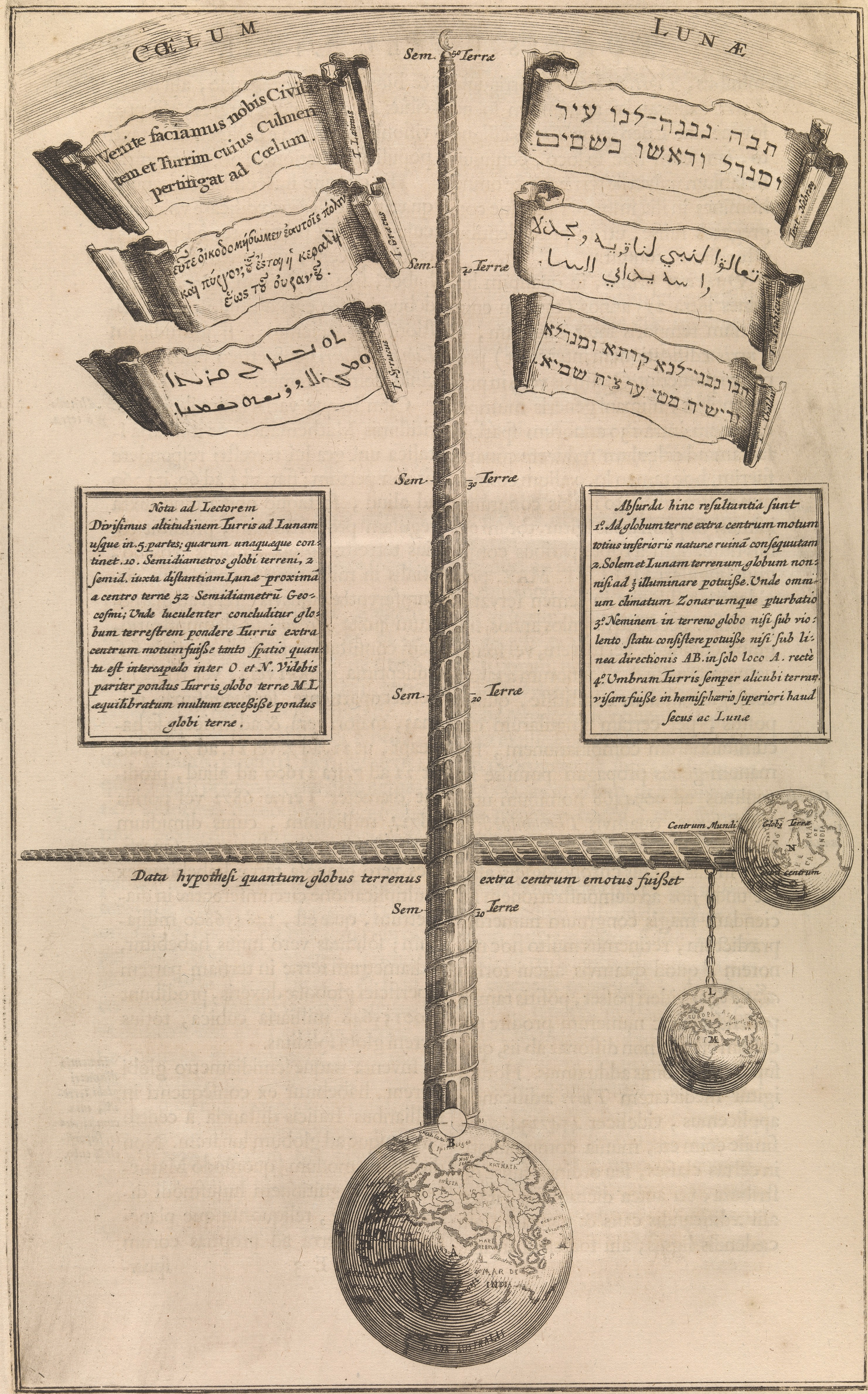
Kircher's diagram of the tower built to Nimrod's specification

In Book One, Kircher resumed the account he had begun in Arca Noë of the generations that came after Noah. He addressed the question of how, just 275 years after the Flood, Noah's great-grandson Nimrod could command such a large number of people to build the Tower. He demonstrated that, assuming each of Noah's sons had a son and a daughter each year, and each of them in turn began procreating at the age of thirty, the world population would have been 24,328,000,000 by Nimrod's time. In fact, Kircher's mathematics were flawed, and by his own method of reckoning the correct total would have been 233,280,000.

== Book two: building the Tower of Babel ==
In Book Two, Kircher devoted much care to demonstrating that Nimrod's building project to build a tower to touch the heavens was physically impossible to achieve, and would have been disastrous for the planet Earth if it had been achieved. Kircher explained that the distance from the Earth to the lowest celestial sphere, that of the Moon, was twenty-five earth diameters. There were not enough building materials in the world to construct a tower so high, and if it had been built it would have pulled the entire planet over out of its equilibrium at the centre of the universe, causing darkness and extreme climate change in many parts of the world.

In addition to this, Kircher offered an illustrated survey of the wonders of the ancient world, including the pyramids of Egypt, the labyrinth of Crete and the colossus of Rhodes.

== Book three: the evolution of language ==
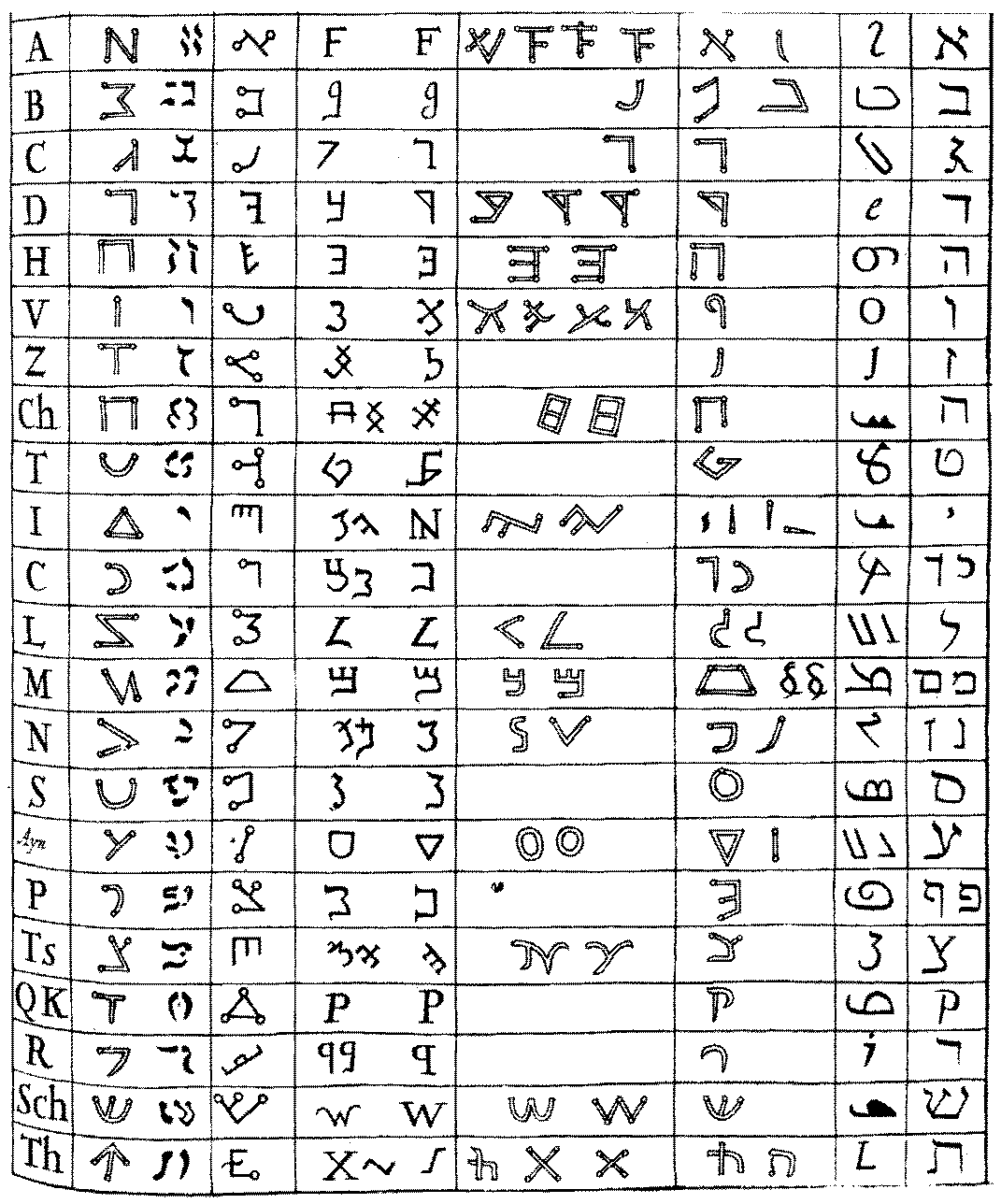
Kircher's table comparing different scripts

The third book of Turris Babel dealt with linguistics. Kircher affirmed that before the Flood there had been no division of nations or languages. His theory of language was that the original human speech of the Garden of Eden was perfect, in that words corresponded exactly with the objects for which they stood. This he called the Lingua Humana, which he declared was a form of early Hebrew language. This had been spoken by Noah and his descendants up to the time of the Confusion of Tongues, when God punished the pride of mankind by dividing them into speakers of many languages.

Kircher did not support the view that God had punished each of the builders of the Tower of Babel by giving them their own language to speak. Rather, he argued that people were divided by family, with Shem and his descendants continuing to speak Hebrew, and his brothers adopting respectively the Greek language, the Latin language, the Teutonic language, and the Slavic language. As people dispersed from Babel, the five basic languages spoken by different branches of Noah's family continued to diversify, leading to the establishment of seventy-two mother languages, from which all languages in the modern world were descended.

As well as discussing spoken language, Kircher also considered writing systems, and showed how a common origin could be found for the Hebrew alphabet and the Latin alphabet. He argued however that the Egyptian hieroglyphs and the Chinese characters did not share this common origin.

Kircher saw the Confusion of Tongues as being the start of a lapse from the true religion into various forms of idolatry. He argued that the deities of different ancient religions were all derived from veneration of the Sun and Moon. He also maintained that variations in human skin colour arose from differences in climate in the places to which people dispersed.

== Illustrations ==
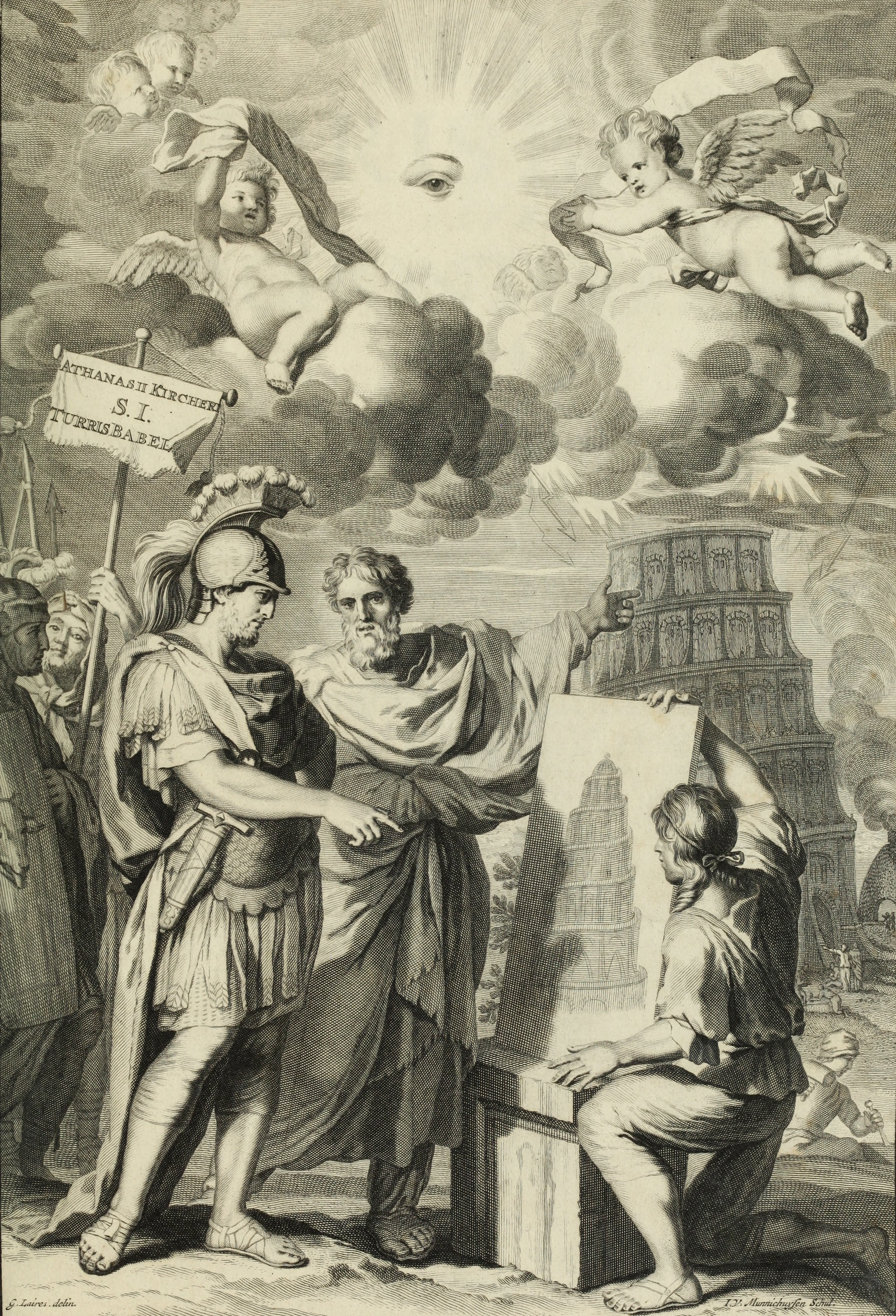
Frontispiece of Turris Babel

Like many of Kircher's other works, Turris Babel was lavishly illustrated. Some of the plates were created by Coenraet Decker. The most famous plate in the book was of the Tower of Babel itself, based on an earlier illustration by Lievin Cruyl. Kircher must have begun work on the project many years before the work was finally published, because several of the plates which illustrated it are dated to 1670.

The frontispiece, by Gérard de Lairesse, depicts Nimrod, dressed as a Roman soldier, studying the plan for the Tower of Babel while its architect, standing next to him, gestures towards the half-built structure some way off. Above them hovers God's all-seeing eye, and lightning strikes down from stormy clouds to show God's anger.
