= Opus scutulatum =

Roman masonry technique

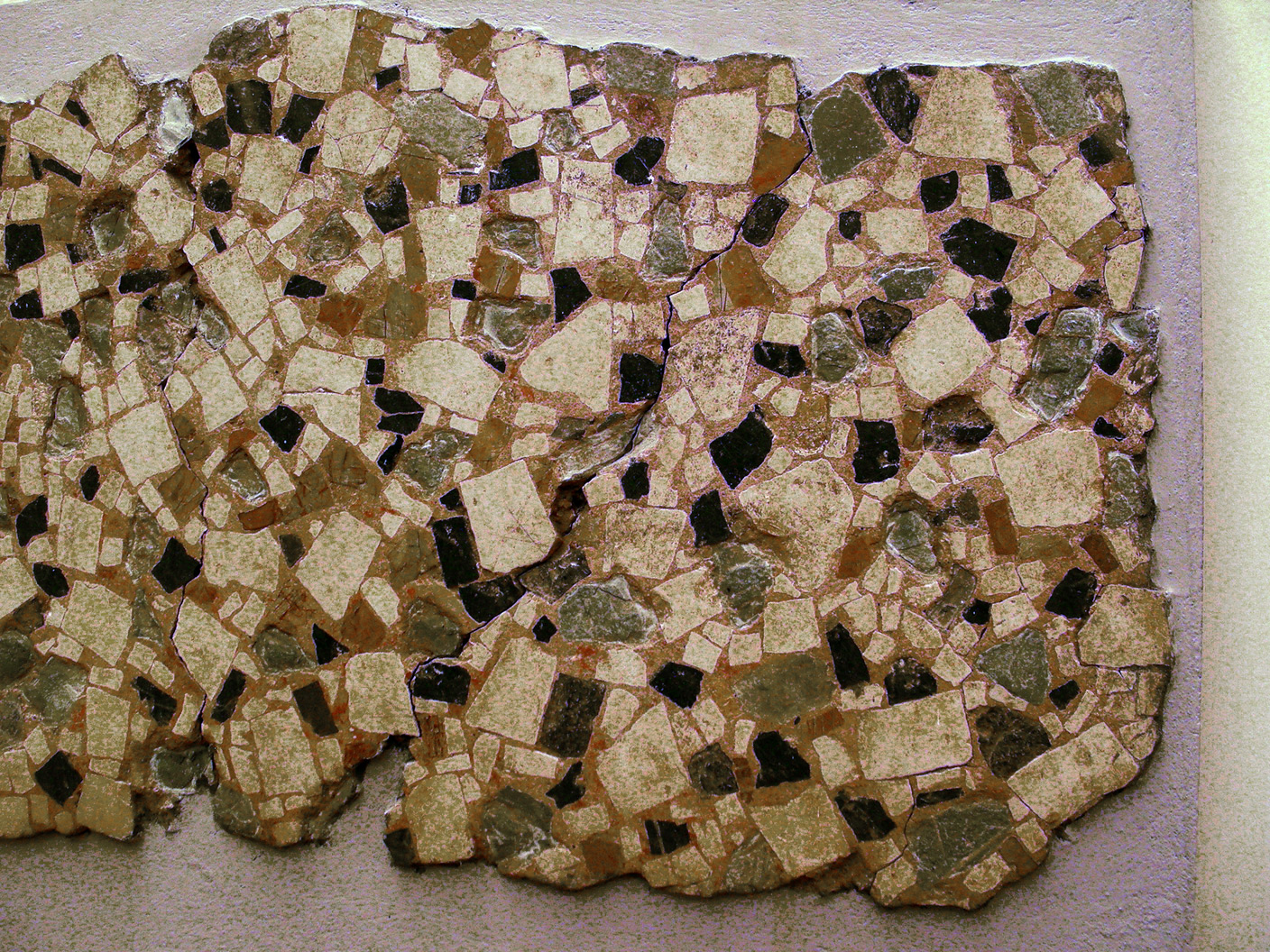
Opus scutulatum in the Temple of Fortuna Primigenia

Opus scutulatum, literally "shield work", is a type of masonry construction used in Roman architecture. It consists of irregular chunks of stone or polychrome marbles on a background of white tesserae lacking figural decoration.

== Description ==
A mosaic floor in opus scutulatum, also called crustae or lithostroton, consists of an almost always monochrome background with inlaid larger scutulae, literally “shields”. These scutulae consist of marble stone fragments of various sizes, colours and shapes. The fragments exist in many shapes; in addition to rectangular ones, triangular and diamond-shaped stones are common. The mosaics of the scutulatum style have the appearance of a simple mosaic pavement lacking figural decoration and were in use throughout the entire Roman Empire.

Pliny (Naturalis Historia XXXVI.185) reports that opus scutulatum was first used in Rome at the beginning of the Third Punic War (149 BC) in the Temple of Jupiter Capitolinus.
