= Temple of Fortuna Primigenia =

Ancient Roman religious complex in Italy

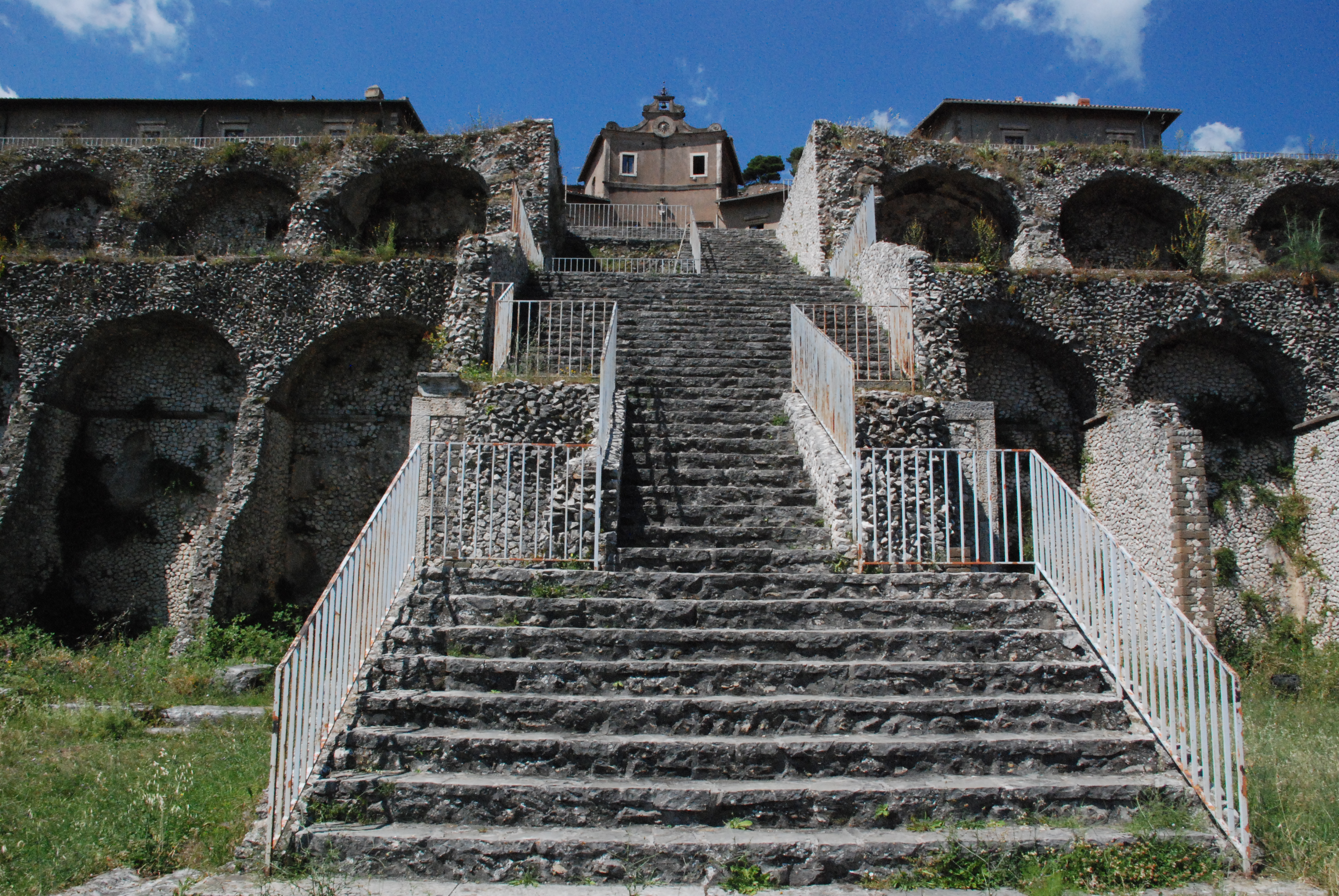
Central staircase

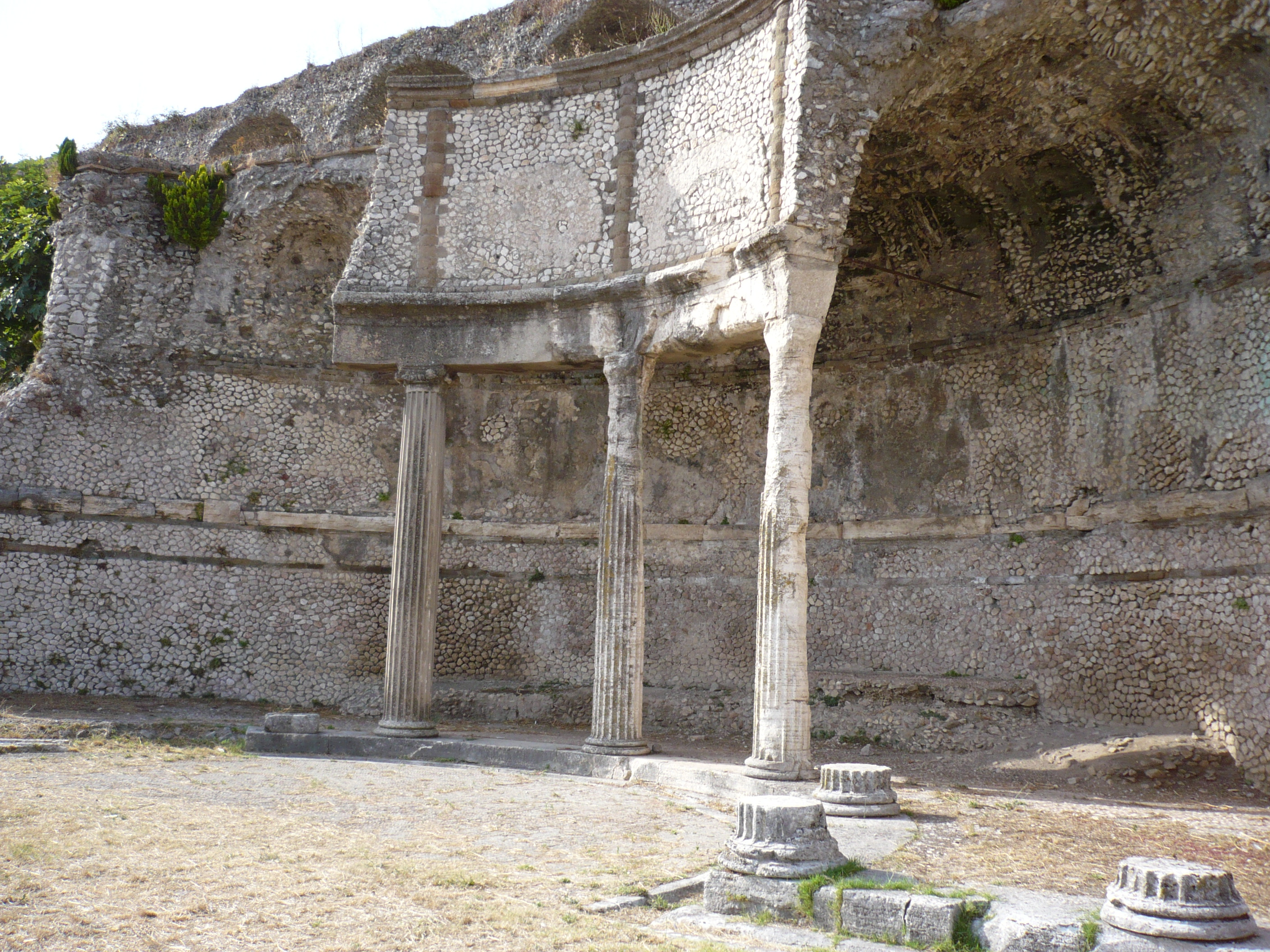
Terrace of the hemicycles; eastern exedra

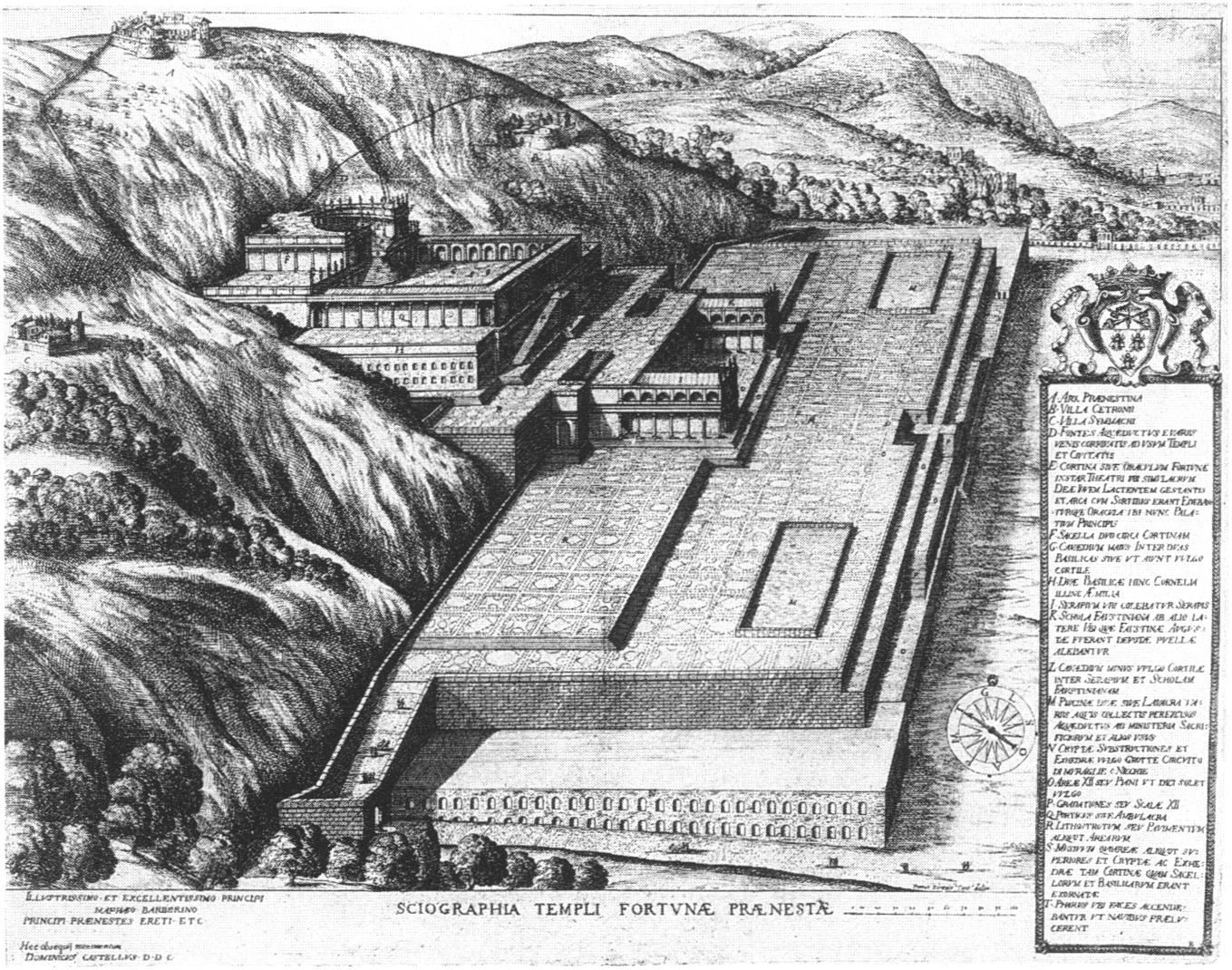
Old Reconstruction

The temple of Fortuna Primigenia was an ancient Roman temple within the sanctuary of Fortuna Primigenia, a religious complex in Praeneste (now Palestrina, 35 km (22 mi) east of Rome). It was dedicated to the goddess Fortuna Primigenia (Primigenia meaning "first born" or "original") and parents brought their newly-born first child to the temple in order to improve its likelihood of surviving infancy and perpetuating the gens.

== Sanctuary ==
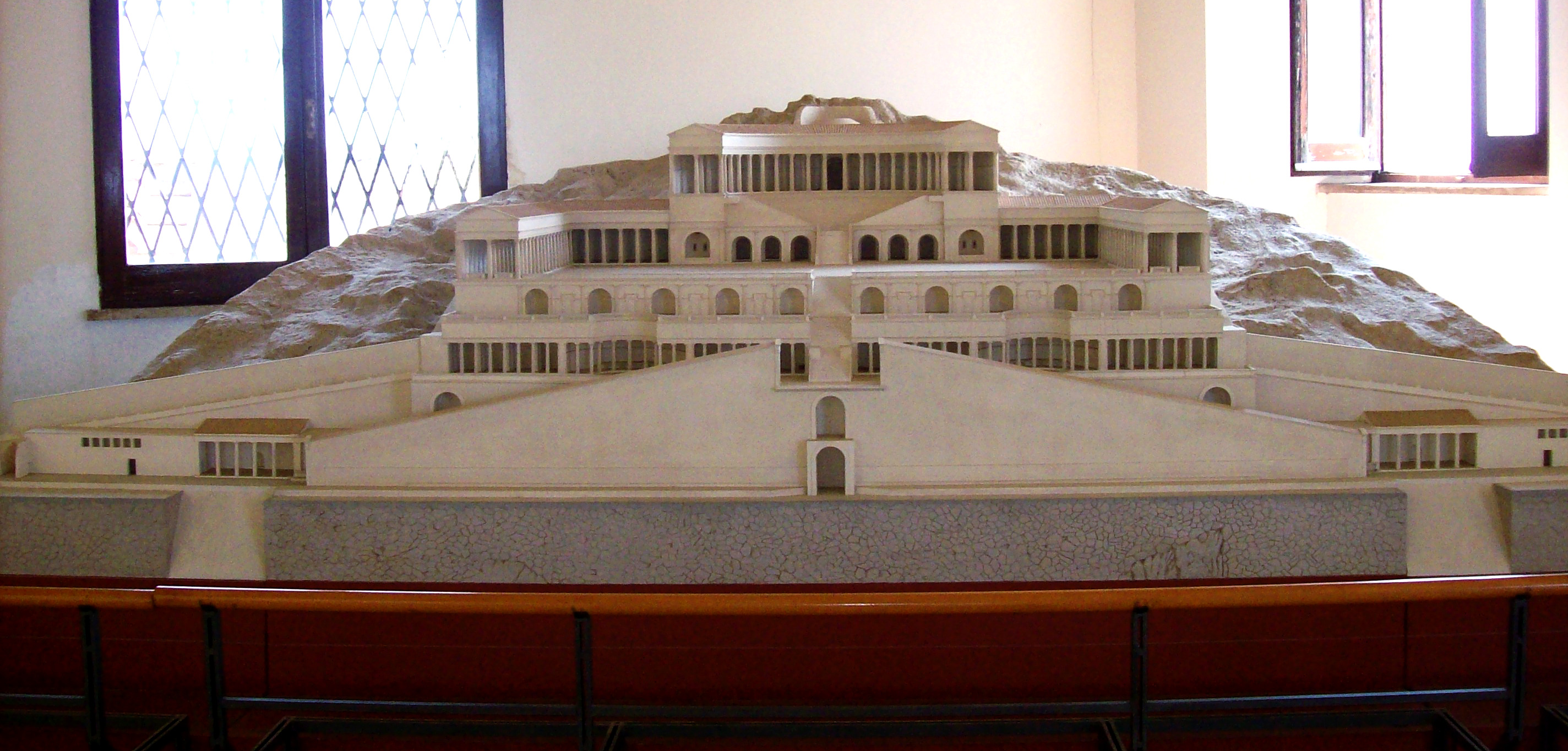
Model of the sanctuary

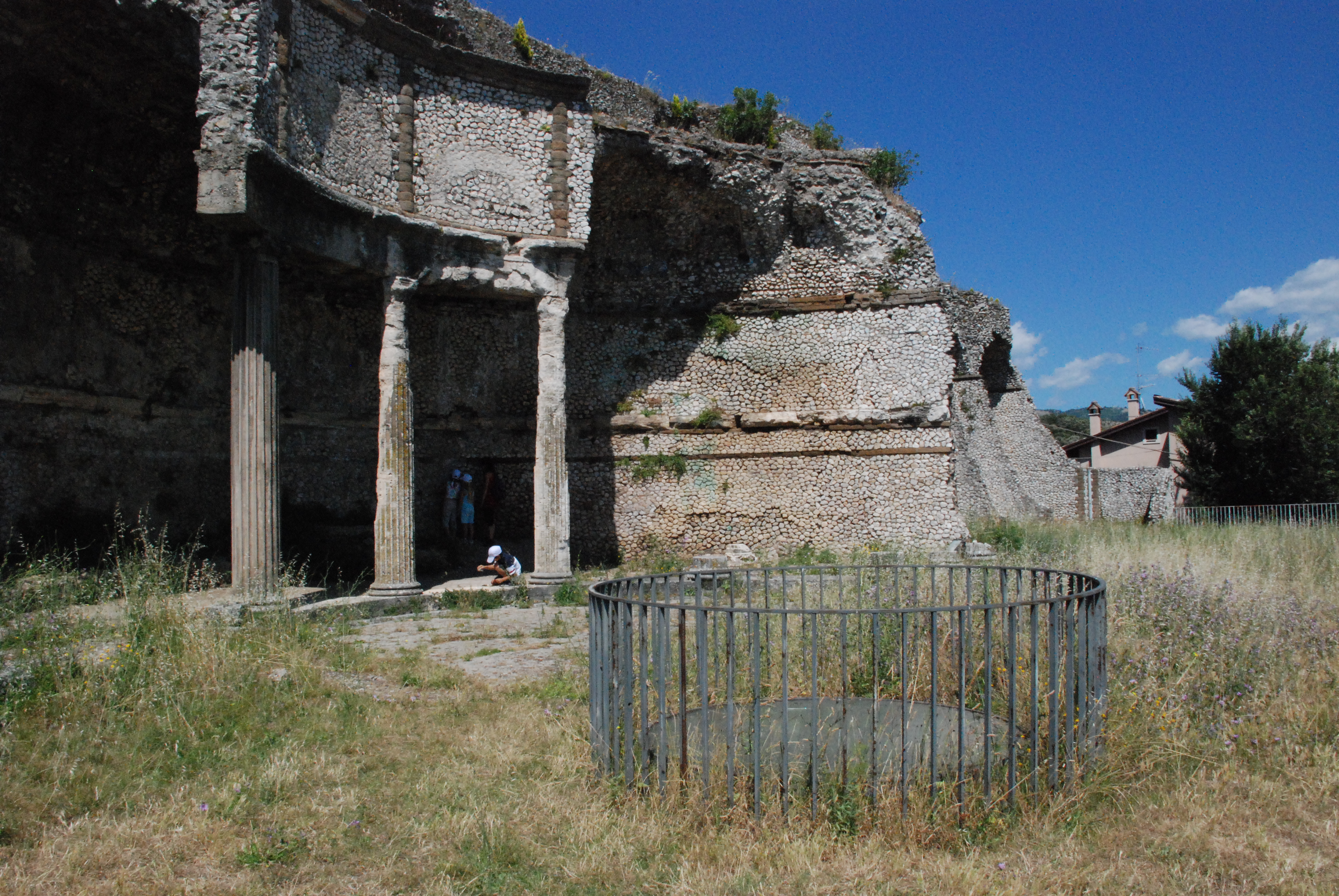
eastern exedra

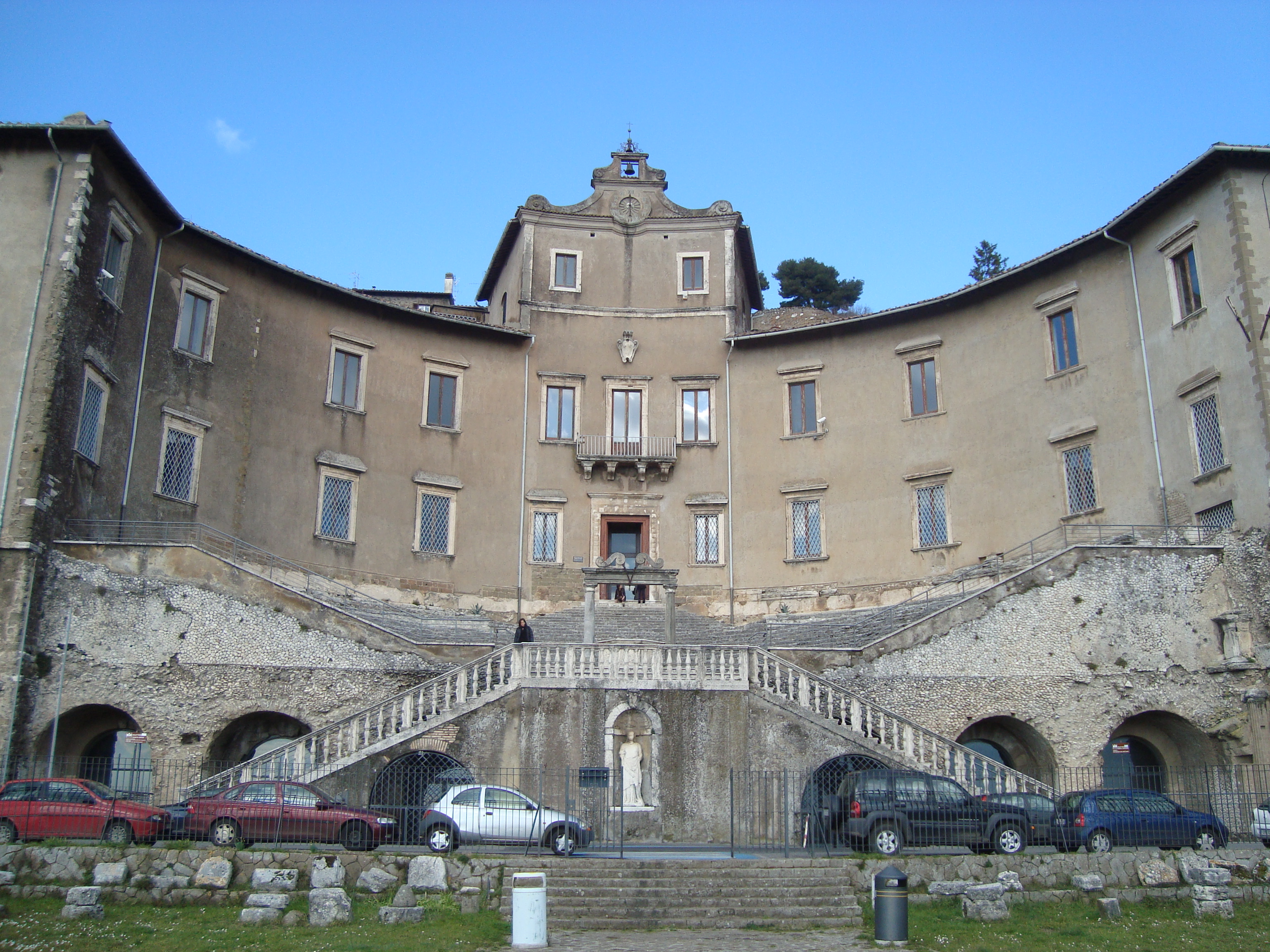
The Palazzo Barberini occupies the upper part of the sanctuary with the theatre

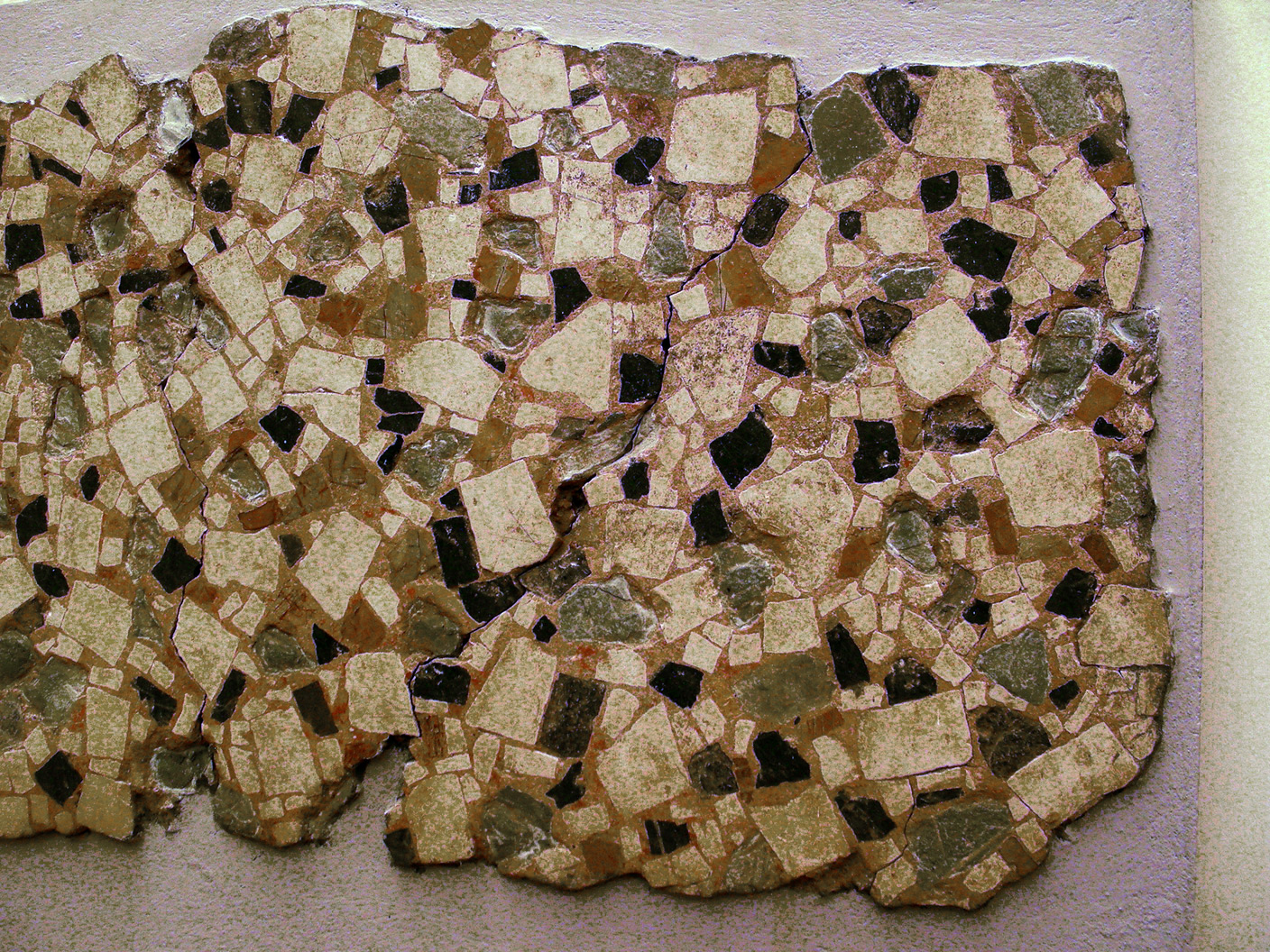
Opus scutulatum floor from the semicircular colonnade above the theatre

The sanctuary of Fortune occupies a series of 6 vast terraces, which, resting on gigantic masonry substructures and connected with each other by grand staircases, rise one above the other on the hill. This immense edifice, probably by far the largest Roman sanctuary, must have presented a most imposing aspect, visible as it was from a great part of Latium, from Rome, and even from the sea. It is a work of high technical and stylistic level.

The great "Cortina terrace" was adorned by porticoes on three sides and led up to the theatre's cavea crowned with porticoes. The small circular temple which topped off the sanctuary, today incorporated into the Palazzo Colonna Barberini, hosted the gilded bronze statue of goddess Fortuna represented as a young warrior.

Along the northern end of the Cortina terrace underneath the stairway of the cavea of the theatre as part of its substructure is a cryptoporticus, a barrel vaulted passage that was an integral part of the sanctuary. It linked the two wings of Corinthian columns that flanked three sides of the terrace and has six supporting arches. Its mosaic floor, only partially preserved, was made of irregular tesserae alternating with chips of polychrome stones (scutulatum). On the outside of the supporting arches are Ionic semicolumns; two big niches stood at the far ends of six arches slightly projecting from the portico front. They were not joined to the cryptoporticus behind, but had waterfalls from their vault (traces of the piping system are still visible). Inscriptions here mention restoration executed by two local magistrates in Sullan times. In the 15th century the supporting arches were bricked up and cryptoporticus was transformed into a cistern which explains the existence of the well today in the theatre.

The so-called terrace of the hemicycles which incorporates two columned exhedra was one of the central places of cult: in front of the exhedra on the right a well is still preserved which may be the one where, according to Cicero, the Praenestine nobleman Numerius Suffucius found the sortes, wooden tablets used to foretell the future.

The lower two terraces just south of via del Borgo linked the Forum area to the upper Sanctuary area and were enlivened by many water displays. On the upper terrace are fountains imitating natural caves (dating from the end of the 3rd to beginning of the 2nd century BC), the oldest examples of the kind in Italy. The lower terrace, supported by a wall in polygonal masonry, was decorated by another nymphaeum set inside an artificial cave, perhaps surrounded by a sacred wood.

=== History ===
From about 175 to 50 BC a series of extravagantly monumentalised sanctuaries were built across Latium such as at Tibur, Nemi and Terracina. The inspiration for this feat of integrated urbanistic design originally lay not in republican Rome but in the Hellenistic monarchies of the eastern Mediterranean, such as the sanctuaries of Delos and Kos. Compared with these Hellenistic models, the Roman innovation was the massive use of opus caementicium which enabled the construction of enormous and daring buildings.

The monumentalisation of the sanctuary dates to the late second century BC and was the work of one of that generation of great architects who worked in Rome and in Italy between the end of the 2nd and the beginning of the 1st century BC. Its motivation was probably due to the wish for social recognition of groups grown rich following exploitation of Roman imperialism after the wars in the East. It foreshadowed the grandiose Imperial style of the following generation.

Sulla may have commissioned further monumentalisation of the sanctuary around 80 BC after he created a Colonia here, to give thanks to Fortuna and commemorate his victory over Gaius Marius, the Roman general and 7-time consul.

== Cults ==
There was a double cult here; that of Fortuna and another where honey was believed to have oozed from an olive tree. The sanctuary brilliantly merged the two sanctuaries at the end of the 2nd century BC in an architectonic and modular structure: the first cult was located in the terrace of the hemicycles, particularly in the eastern one with the well, while the second cult centre was further up with the main temple.

The goddess Fortuna here went by the epithet of Primigenia (meaning "first born") and was represented suckling two babes, as in the Christian representation of Charity, said to be Jupiter and Juno, and she was especially worshipped by matrons. The cult featured an oracle, consulted by the picking of lots as described by Cicero. The oracle continued to be consulted down to Christian times, until Constantine the Great, and again later Theodosius I, forbade the practice and closed the temple.

== Influence ==
Features of the sanctuary influenced Roman garden design on steeply sloped sites through Antiquity and once again in Italian villa gardens from the 15th century. The Victor Emmanuel II Monument in Rome owes much to the site.

== See also ==
- List of Ancient Roman temples
- The Nile mosaic
