= Coenraet Decker =

Dutch Golden Age engraver

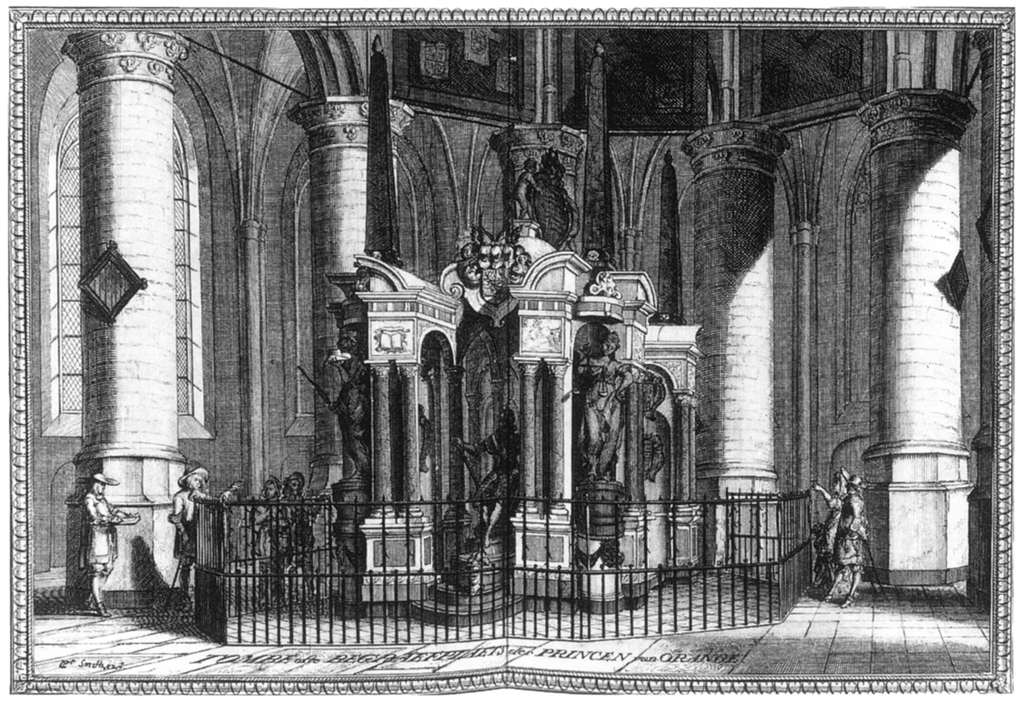
The Tomb of William the Silent in the Nieuwe Kerk, Delft.

Coenraet Decker (1650 in Amsterdam – 1685 in Amsterdam) was a Dutch Golden Age engraver.

According to the RKD, he had been a pupil of Romeyn de Hooghe and married Aechje Jans in 1673 in Sloterdijk when he was 23. In the 1670s, he worked on the map of Delft contract that he won together with Dirk van Bleiswijk, for their work on Bleiswijk's Description of Delft (Dutch: Beschryvinge der stad Delft).
