= Rome =

Capital and largest city of Italy

Rome Roma (Italian)
- Capital city and comune
- Roma Capitale
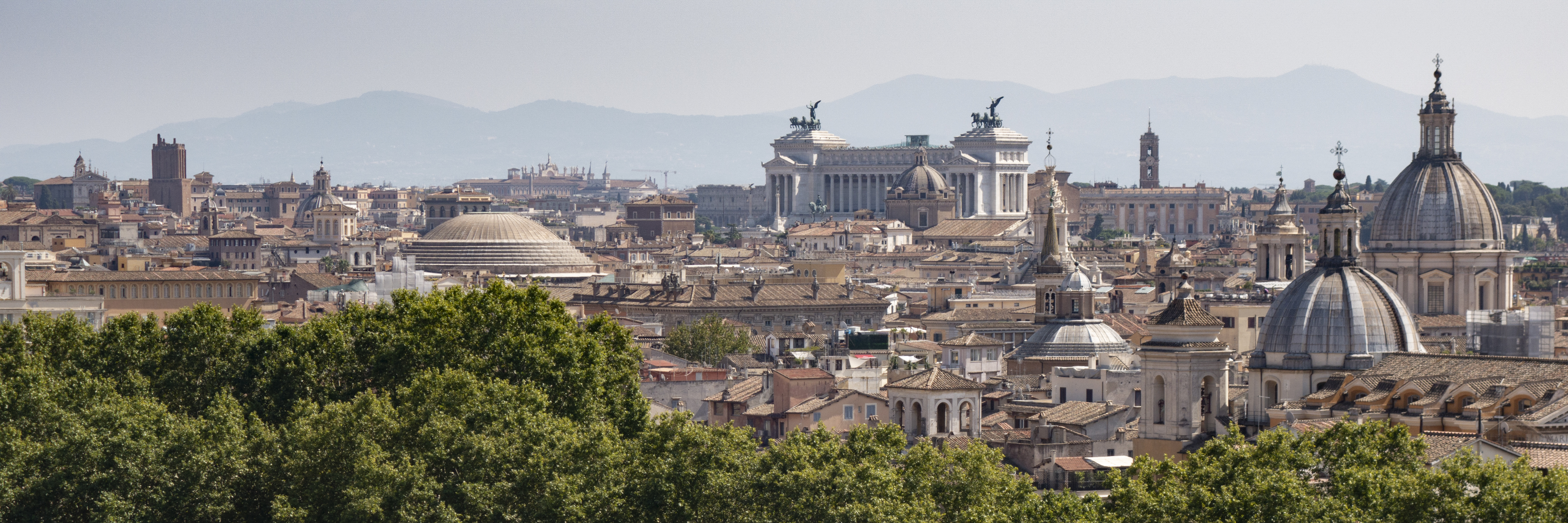
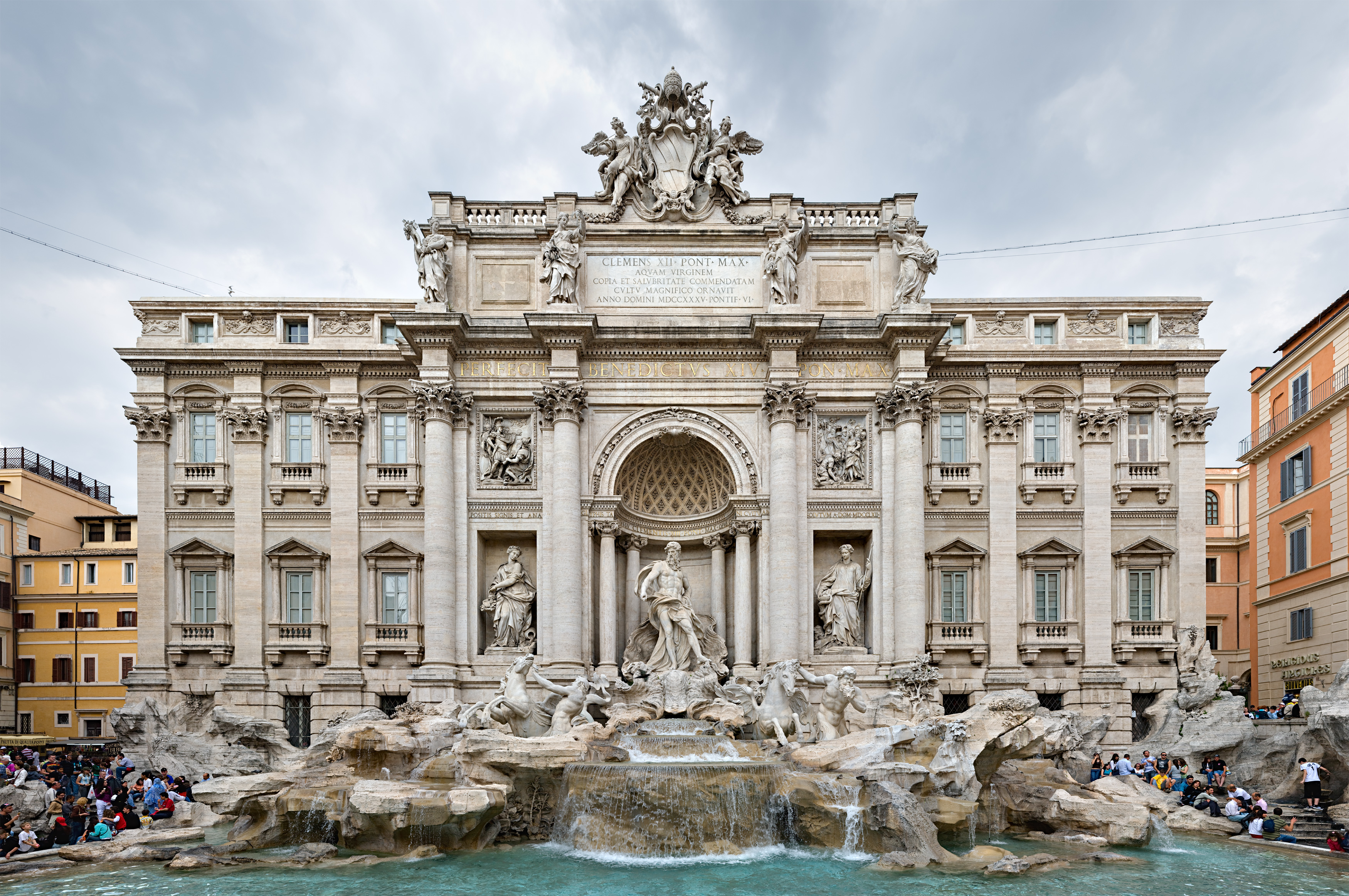
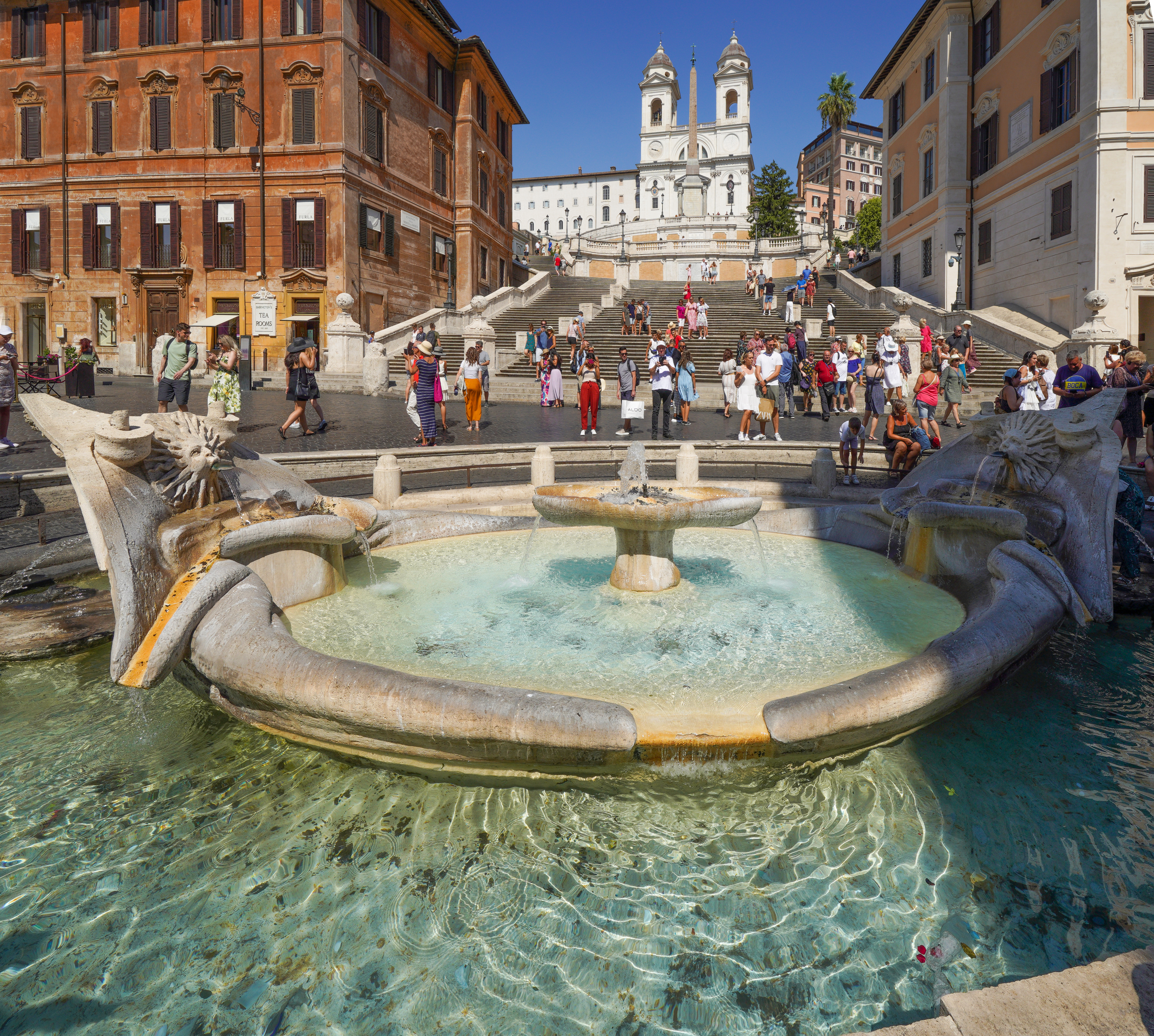
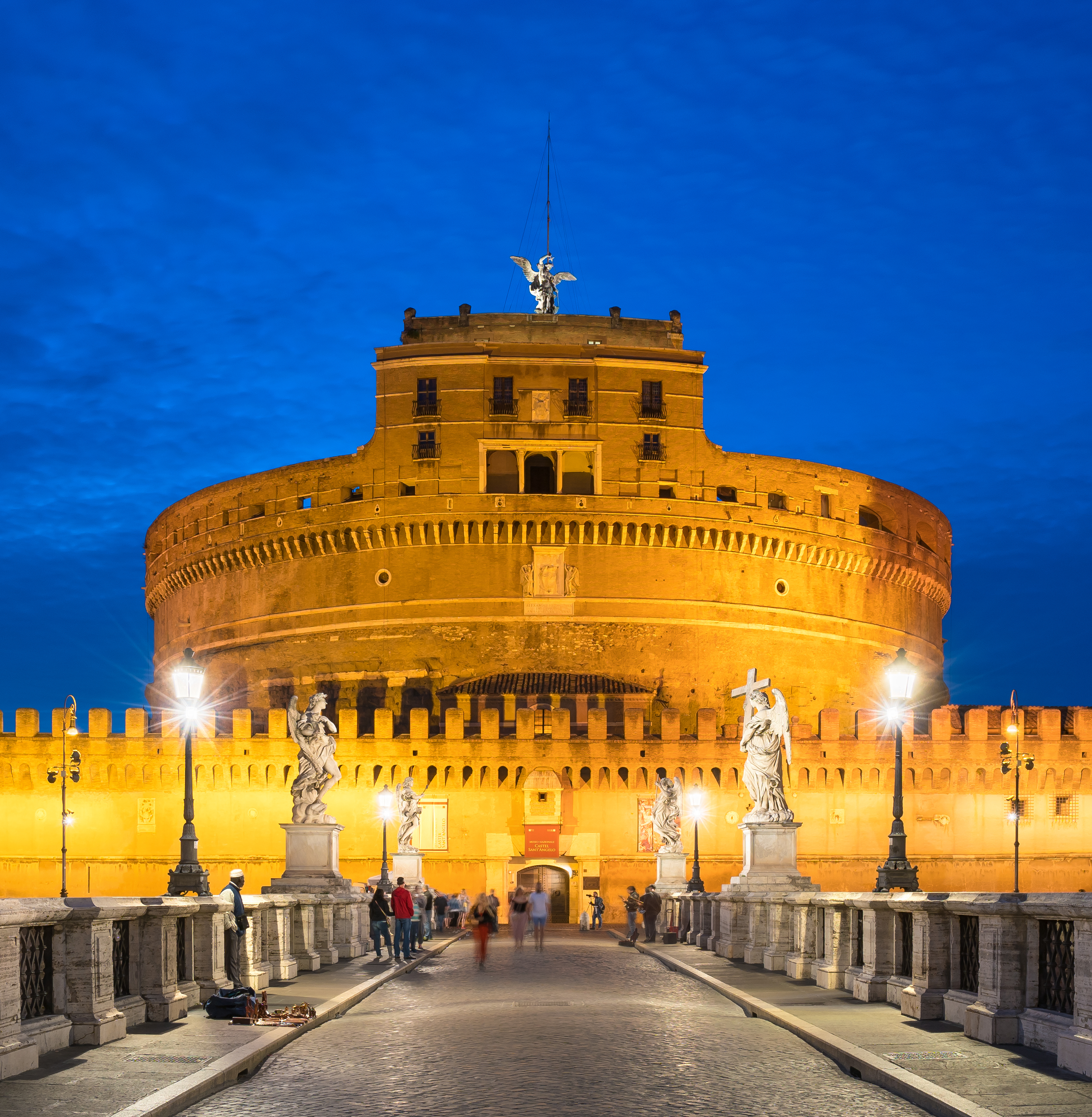
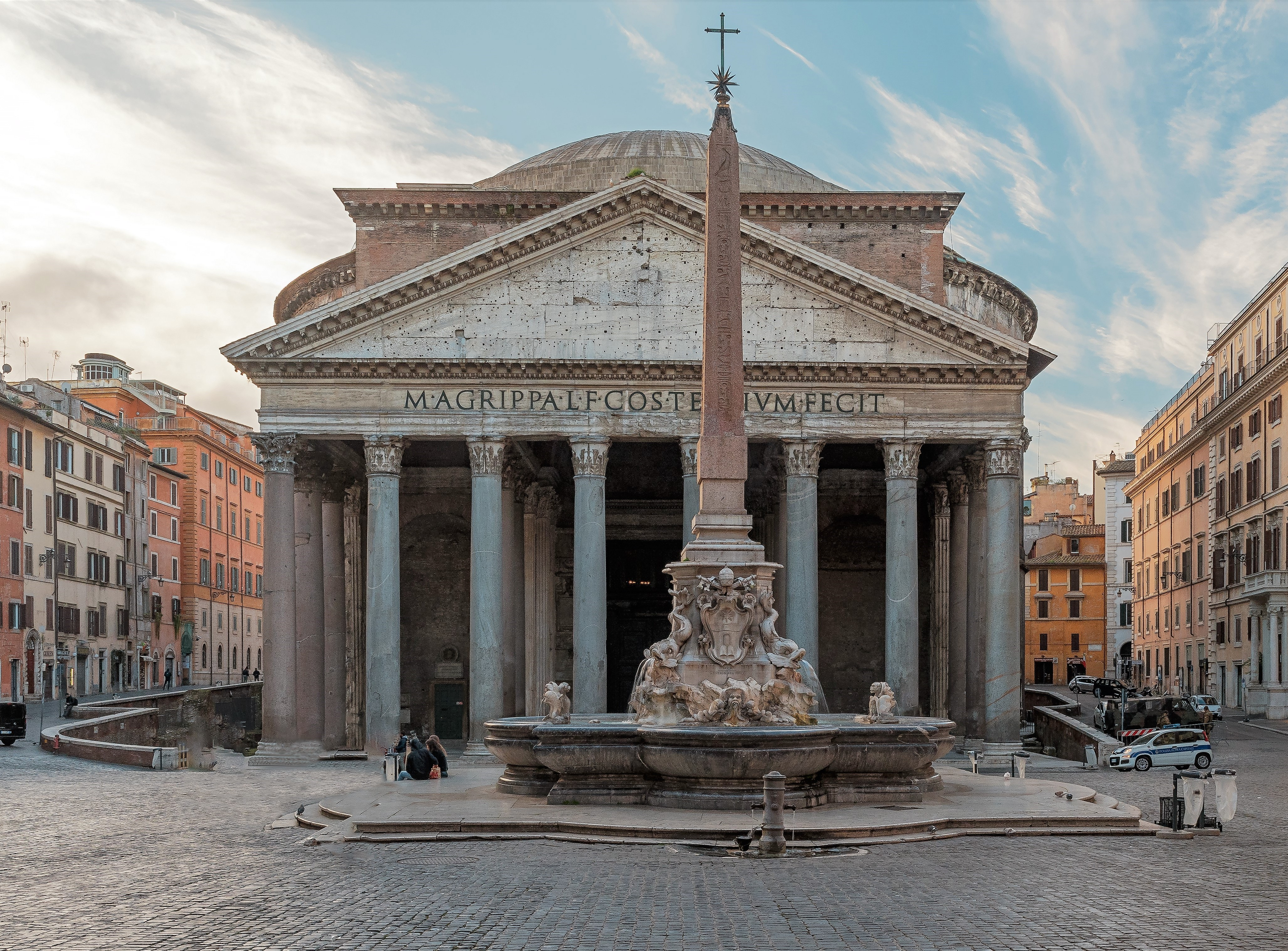
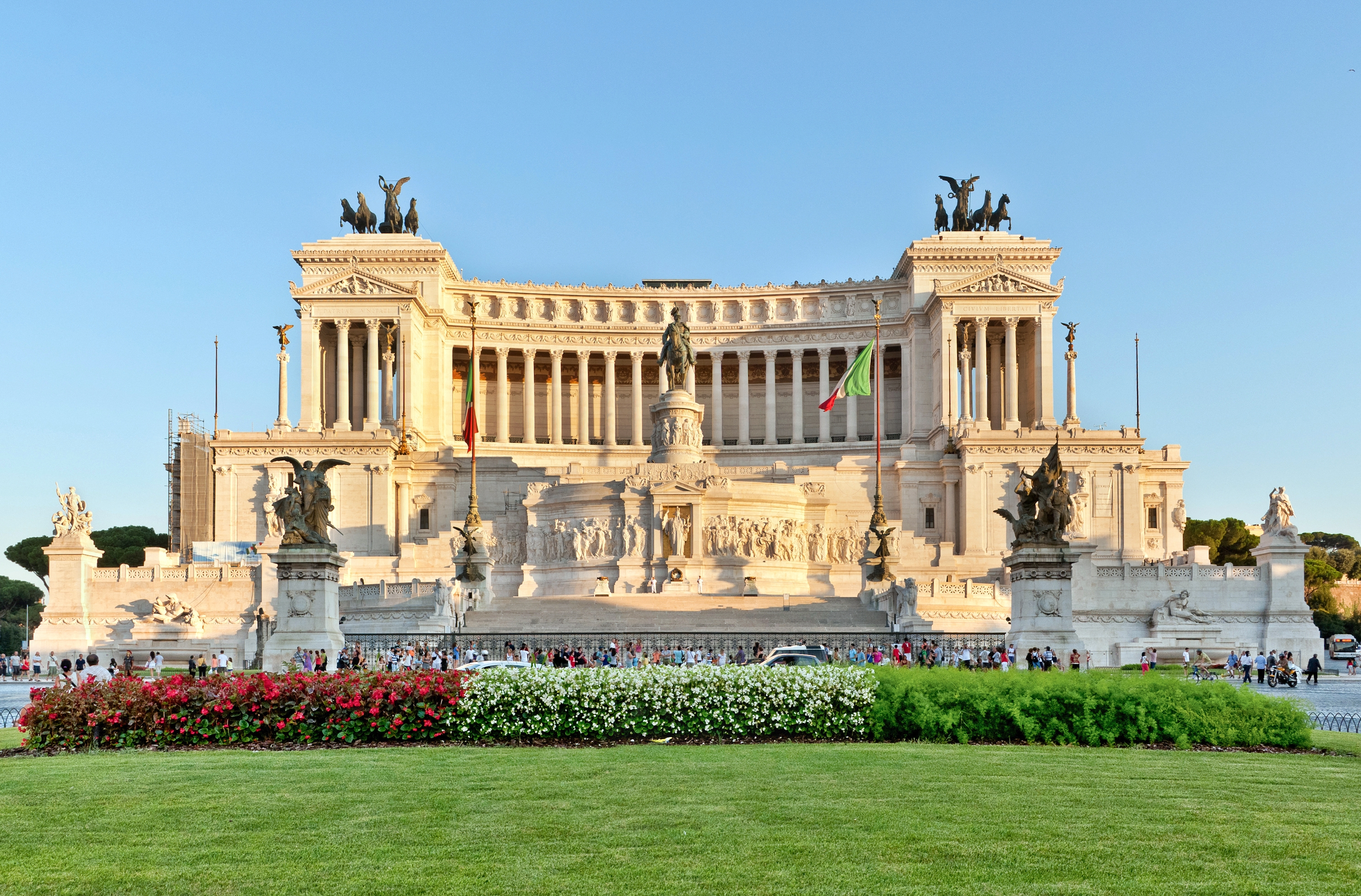
- Rome skyline from Castel Sant'Angelo Colosseum Trevi Fountain Barcaccia, Spanish Steps and Trinità dei Monti St. Peter's Basilica (Vatican City) Castel Sant'Angelo Pantheon and Piazza della Rotonda Victor Emmanuel II Monument

- Flag Gonfalon Coat of arms
- Etymology: various theories (See Etymology).
- Nicknames: Urbs Aeterna (Latin); The Eternal City; Caput Mundi (Latin); The Capital of the world Throne of St. Peter
- The territory of the comune (Roma Capitale, in red) inside the Metropolitan City of Rome (Città Metropolitana di Roma, in yellow). The spot in the centre is Vatican City.
- Interactive map of Rome
- Location within Italy Location within Europe
- Coordinates: 41°53′36″N 12°28′58″E
- Country: Italy (Note: Also the Vatican City)
- Region: Lazio
- Metropolitan city: Rome Capital
- Founded: 21 April 753 BC
- Founder: King Romulus (legendary)

Government
  - Type: Strong Mayor–Council
  - Mayor: Roberto Gualtieri (PD)
  - Legislature: Capitoline Assembly

Area
  - Municipality: 1,287.36 km^{2} (497.05 sq mi)
  - Metropolitan city: 5,363.28 km^{2} (2,070.77 sq mi)
- Elevation: 21 m (69 ft)

Population (2026)
  - Municipality: 2,745,062
  - Rank: 8th in Europe; 1st in Italy
  - Density: 2,132.32/km^{2} (5,522.68/sq mi)
  - Metropolitan city: 4,224,901
  - Metropolitan city density: 787.746/km^{2} (2,040.25/sq mi)
- Demonym(s): Italian: romano(i) (masculine), romana(e) (feminine); English: Roman(s)

GDP (nominal, 2023)
  - Metropolitan city: €201.290 billion
  - Per capita: €47,665
- Time zone: UTC+01:00 (CET)
  - Summer (DST): UTC+02:00 (CEST)
- CAP code(s): 00100; 00118 to 00199
- Area code: 06
- Website: comune.roma.it

UNESCO World Heritage Site
- Official name: Historic Centre of Rome, the Properties of the Holy See in that City Enjoying Extraterritorial Rights and San Paolo Fuori le Mura
- Reference: 91
- Inscription: 1980 (4th Session)
- Area: 1,431 ha (3,540 acres)

Rome (Note: English: /roʊm/ ROHM; Italian and Latin: Roma, pronounced [ˈroːma].) is the capital and largest city of Italy. It is also the administrative centre of the Lazio region and of the Metropolitan City of Rome. A special municipality named Roma Capitale with a population of 2.7 million in an area of 1,287.36 km^{2} (497.1 mi^{2}), Rome is the third most populous city in the European Union by population within city limits. The Metropolitan City of Rome Capital, with a population of 4.2 million, is the most populous metropolitan city in Italy. Its metropolitan area is the third-most populous within Italy. Rome is located in the central-western portion of the Italian Peninsula, within Lazio (Latium), along the shores of the Tiber Valley. Vatican City—the smallest country in the world and headquarters of the worldwide Catholic Church under the governance of the Holy See—is an independent country within Rome's municipal boundaries, the only existing example of a country within a city. Rome is often referred to as the "City of Seven Hills" due to its geography, and also as the "Eternal City". Rome is generally considered to be one of the cradles of Western civilization and Western Christian culture.

Rome's history spans 28 centuries. While Roman mythology dates the founding of Rome at around 753 BC, the site has been inhabited for much longer, making it a major human settlement for over three millennia and one of the oldest continuously occupied cities in Europe. The city's early population originated from a mix of Latins, Etruscans, and Sabines. Eventually, the city successively became the capital of the Roman Kingdom, the Roman Republic and the Roman Empire, and is regarded by many as the first-ever Imperial city and metropolis. It was first called The Eternal City (Latin: Urbs Aeterna; Italian: La Città Eterna) by the Roman poet Tibullus in the 1st century BC, and the expression was also taken up by Ovid, Virgil, and Livy. Rome is also called Caput Mundi (Capital of the World).

After the fall of the Empire in the west, which marked the beginning of the Middle Ages, Rome slowly fell under the political control of the Papacy, and in the 8th century, it became the capital of the Papal States, which lasted until 1870. Beginning with the Renaissance, almost all popes since Nicholas V (1447–1455) pursued a coherent architectural and urban programme over four hundred years, aimed at making the city the artistic and cultural centre of the world. In this way, Rome first became one of the major centres of the Renaissance and subsequently the birthplace of both the Baroque style and Neoclassicism. Famous artists, painters, sculptors, and architects made Rome the centre of their activity, creating masterpieces throughout the city. In 1871, Rome became the capital of the Kingdom of Italy, which, in 1946, became the Italian Republic. It hosted the Summer Olympics in 1960.

In 2019, Rome was the 14th most visited city in the world with 8.6 million tourists, the third most visited city in the European Union, and the most popular tourist destination in Italy. Its historic centre is listed by UNESCO as a World Heritage Site. Rome is also the seat of several specialised agencies of the United Nations, such as the Food and Agriculture Organization, the World Food Programme, and the International Fund for Agricultural Development. The city also hosts the Secretariat of the Parliamentary Assembly of the Union for the Mediterranean, as well as the headquarters of several Italian multinational companies such as Eni, Enel, TIM, Leonardo, and banks such as BNL. Numerous companies are based within Rome's EUR business district, such as the luxury fashion house Fendi located in the Palazzo della Civiltà Italiana. The presence of renowned international brands in the city has made Rome an important centre of fashion and design, and the Cinecittà Studios have been the set of many Academy Award–winning movies.

== Name and symbol ==
=== Etymology ===
According to the Ancient Romans' founding myth, the name Roma came from the city's founder and first king, Romulus.

However, it is possible that the name Romulus was actually derived from Rome itself. As early as the 4th century, there have been alternative theories proposed on the origin of the name Roma. Several hypotheses have been advanced focusing on its linguistic roots which however remain uncertain:

- From Rumon or Rumen, archaic name of the Tiber, which in turn is supposedly related to the Greek verb ῥέω (rhéō) 'to flow, stream' and the Latin verb ruō 'to hurry, rush'; (Note: This hypothesis originates from the Roman Grammarian Maurus Servius Honoratus. However, the Greek verb descends from the Proto-Indo-European root *srew- (compare Ancient Greek ῥεῦμα (rheûma) 'a stream, flow, current', the Thracian river name Στρυμών (Strumṓn) and Proto-Germanic *strauma- 'stream'; if it was related, however, the Latin river name would be expected to begin with *Frum-, like Latin frīgeō 'to freeze' from the root *sreyHg-) and the Latin verb from *h₃rew-.)
- From the Etruscan word 𐌓𐌖𐌌𐌀 (ruma), whose root is *rum- "teat", with possible reference either to the totem wolf that adopted and suckled the cognately named twins Romulus and Remus, or to the shape of the Palatine and Aventine Hills;
- From the Greek word ῥώμη (rhṓmē), which means strength. (Note: This hypothesis originates from Plutarch.)

=== Other names and symbols ===
Rome has also been called in ancient times simply "Urbs" (central city), from urbs roma, or identified with its ancient Roman initialism of SPQR, the symbol of Rome's constituted republican government. In 192, emperor Commodus renamed the city Colonia Lucia Annia Commodiana after himself, but the name was reverted to Rome after his assassination at the end of the year. Furthermore, Rome has been called Urbs Aeterna (The Eternal City), Caput Mundi (The Capital of the world), Throne of St. Peter and Roma Capitale.

Dionysius of Halicarnassus states that the lagobolon was a symbol of the settlement of the city of Rome, and recounts that following the destruction by fire of a sacred hut of Mars on the Palatine Hill, a lagobolon, which Romulus used to delineate the regions for taking auspices when founding the city, was found miraculously preserved among the ashes.

== History ==
=== Earliest history ===
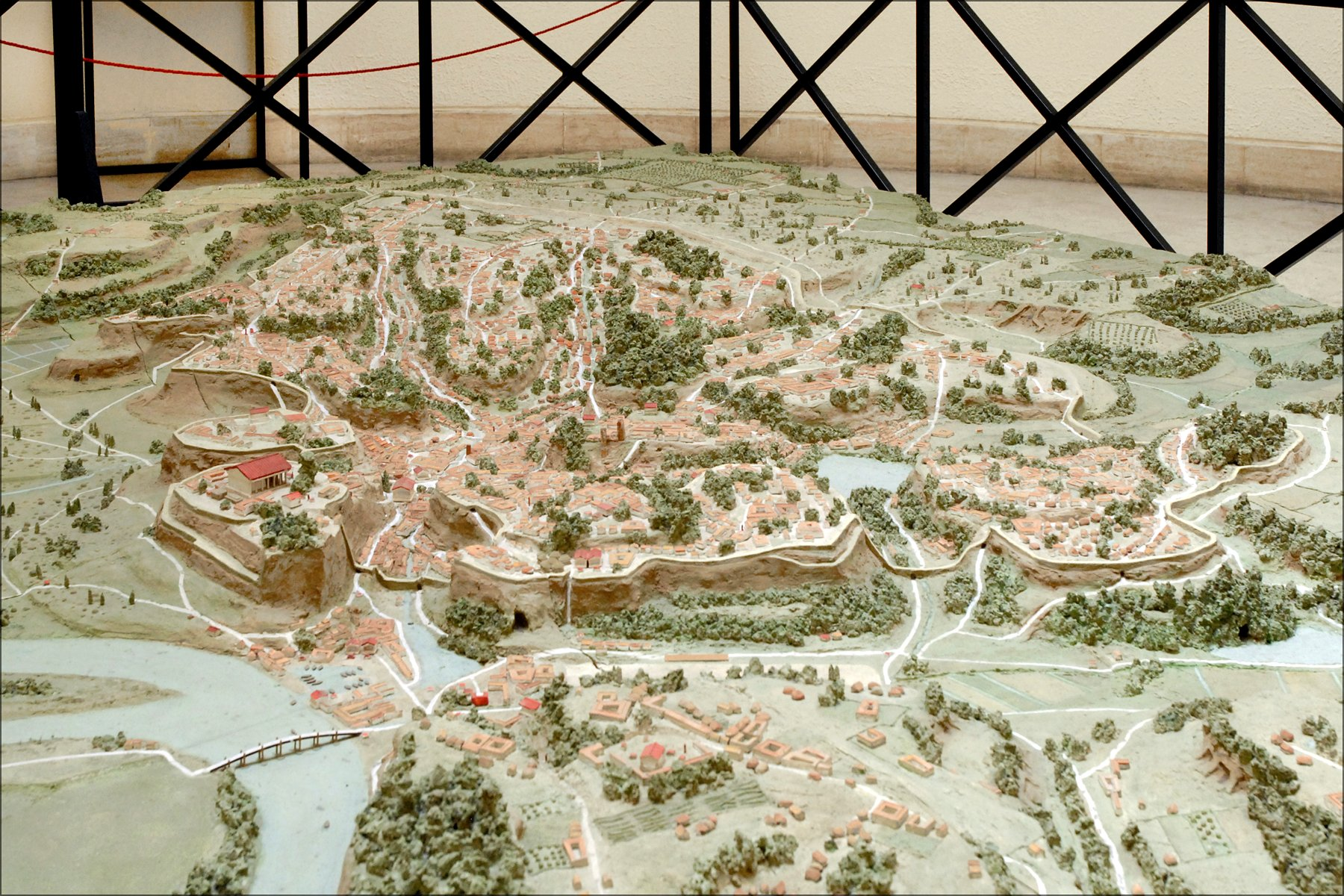
Model of archaic Rome. The image faces northeast, with the Capitoline Hill on left and the Palatine Hill on the right. The city would not have looked like this prior to the seventh century BC.

Archaeological evidence of human occupation of the Rome area has been found from approximately 14,000 years ago, although the dense layer of much younger debris obscures Palaeolithic and Neolithic sites. Evidence of stone tools, pottery, and stone weapons attest to about 10,000 years of human presence in the Rome area. Several excavations support the view that Rome grew from pastoral settlements on the Palatine Hill built above the area of the future Roman Forum. Between the end of the Bronze Age and the beginning of the Iron Age, each hill between the sea and the Capitoline Hill was topped by a village (on the Capitoline, a village is attested since the end of the 14th century BC). However, none of them yet had an urban quality.

Nowadays, there is a wide consensus that the city developed gradually through the aggregation ("synoecism") of several villages around the largest one, placed above the Palatine. This aggregation was facilitated by the increase of agricultural productivity above the subsistence level, which also allowed the establishment of secondary and tertiary activities. These, in turn, boosted the development of trade with the Greek colonies of southern Italy (mainly Ischia and Cumae). These developments, which according to archaeological evidence took place during the mid-eighth century BC, can be considered as the "birth" of the city. Despite recent excavations at the Palatine Hill, the view that Rome was founded deliberately in the middle of the eighth century BC, as the legend of Romulus suggests, remains a fringe hypothesis.

==== Legend of the founding of Rome ====
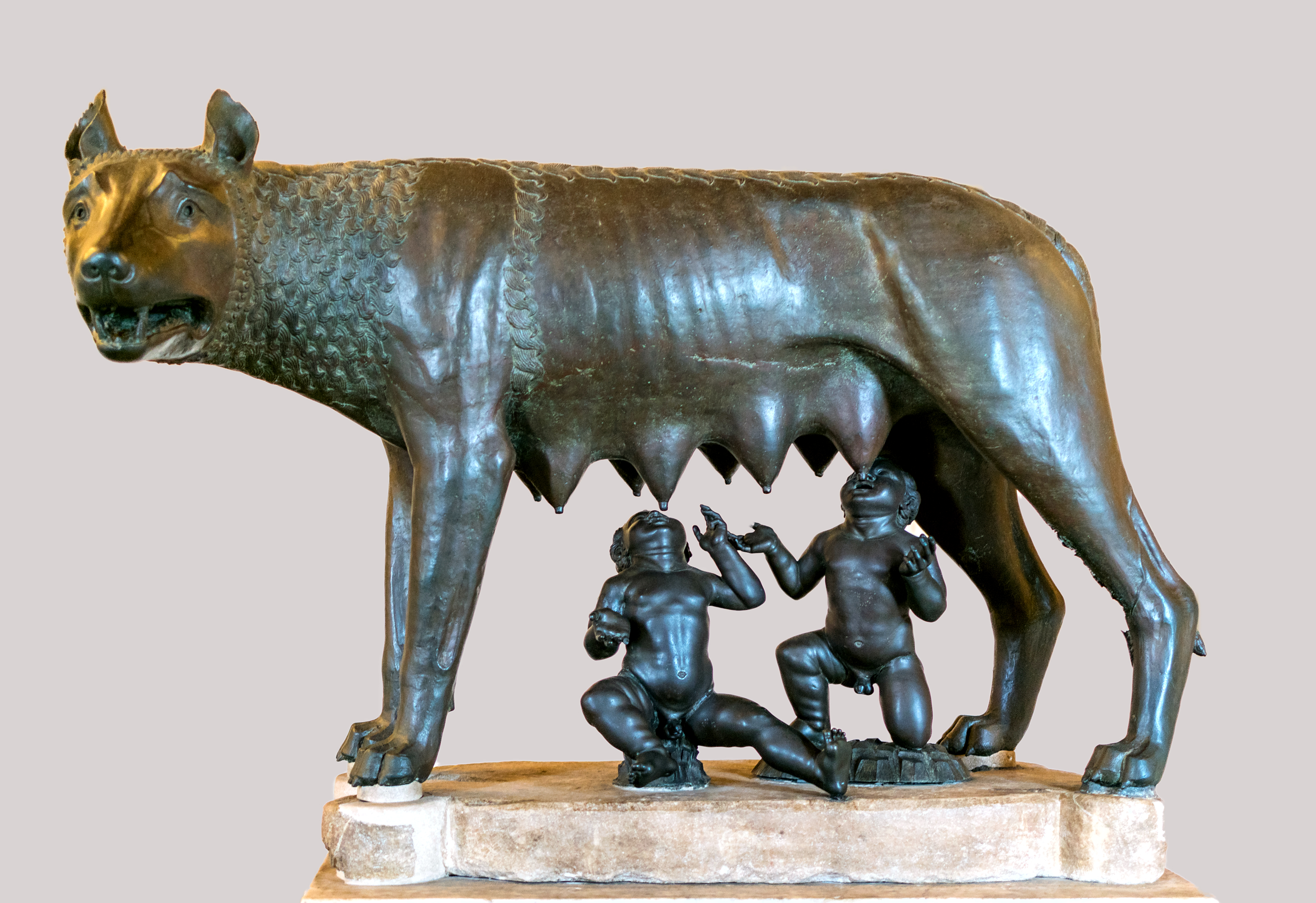
Capitoline Wolf, a sculpture of the mythical she-wolf suckling the infant twins Romulus and Remus

Traditional stories handed down by the ancient Romans themselves explain the earliest history of their city in terms of legend and myth. The most familiar of these myths, and perhaps the most famous of all Roman myths, is the story of Romulus and Remus, the twins who were suckled by a she-wolf. They decided to build a city, but after an argument, Romulus killed his brother and the city took his name. According to the Roman annalists, this happened on 21 April 753 BC. This legend had to be reconciled with a dual tradition, set earlier in time, that had the Trojan refugee Aeneas escape to Italy and found the line of Romans through his son Iulus, the namesake of the Julio-Claudian dynasty. This was accomplished by the Roman poet Virgil in the first century BC. In addition, Strabo mentions an older story, that the city was an Arcadian colony founded by Evander. Strabo also writes that Lucius Coelius Antipater believed that Rome was founded by Greeks.

=== Monarchy and republic ===
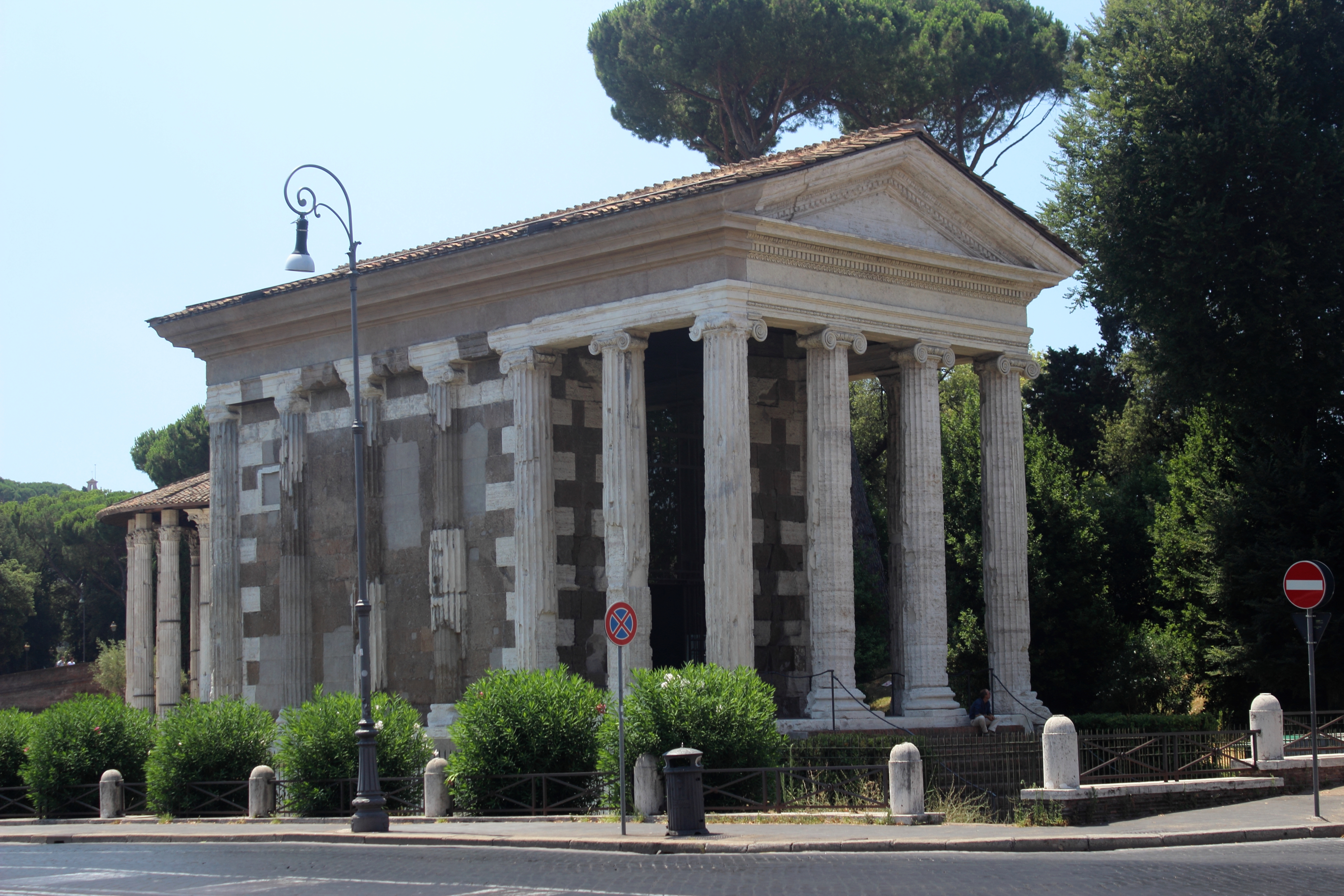
The Temple of Portunus, god of grain storage, keys, livestock and ports, built in 120–80 BC

The Roman Forum contains the ruins of the buildings that represented the political, legal, religious and economic centre of ancient Rome, constituting the "nerve centre" of all Roman civilisation.

After the foundation by Romulus (according to a legend), Rome was ruled for a period of 244 years by a monarchy. The first rulers were of Latin and Sabine origin, and later ones were Etruscan. The tradition handed down seven kings: Romulus, Numa Pompilius, Tullus Hostilius, Ancus Marcius, Tarquinius Priscus, Servius Tullius and Lucius Tarquinius Superbus.

In 509 BC, the Romans expelled the last king from their city and established an oligarchic republic led by two annually elected consuls. Rome then began a period characterised by internal struggles between patricians (aristocrats) and plebeians (small landowners), and by constant warfare against the populations of central Italy: Etruscans, Latins, Volsci, Aequi, and Marsi. After becoming master of Latium, Rome led several wars (against the Gauls, Osci-Samnites and the Greek colony of Taranto, allied with Pyrrhus, king of Epirus) whose result was the conquest of the Italian peninsula, from the central area down to Magna Graecia.

The 3rd and 4th century BC saw the establishment of Roman hegemony over the Mediterranean and the Balkans through the three Punic Wars (264–146 BC) fought against Carthage and the three Macedonian Wars (212–168 BC) against Macedonia. The first Roman provinces were established at this time: Sicily, Sardinia and Corsica, Hispania, Macedonia, Achaea and Africa.

From the beginning of the 2nd century BC, power was contested between two groups of aristocrats: the optimates, representing the conservative part of the Roman Senate, and the populares, who relied on the help of the plebs (urban lower class) to gain power. In the same period, the bankruptcy of the small farmers and the establishment of large slave estates caused large-scale migration to the city. The continuous warfare led to the establishment of a professional army, which turned out to be more loyal to its generals than to the republic. Because of this, in the late 2nd and early 1st century BC there were several conflicts both abroad and internally: after the failed attempt of social reform of the populares Tiberius and Gaius Gracchus, and the war against Jugurtha, there was a civil war from which the general Sulla emerged victorious. A major slave revolt under Spartacus followed, and then the establishment of the first Triumvirate with Caesar, Pompey and Crassus.

Caesar's conquest of Gaul made him immensely powerful and popular, which led to a civil war against the Senate and Pompey. After his victory, Caesar established himself as dictator for life. His assassination in 44 BC led to a second Triumvirate among Octavian (Caesar's grandnephew and heir), Mark Antony and Lepidus, and to a final civil war between Octavian and Antony.

=== Empire ===
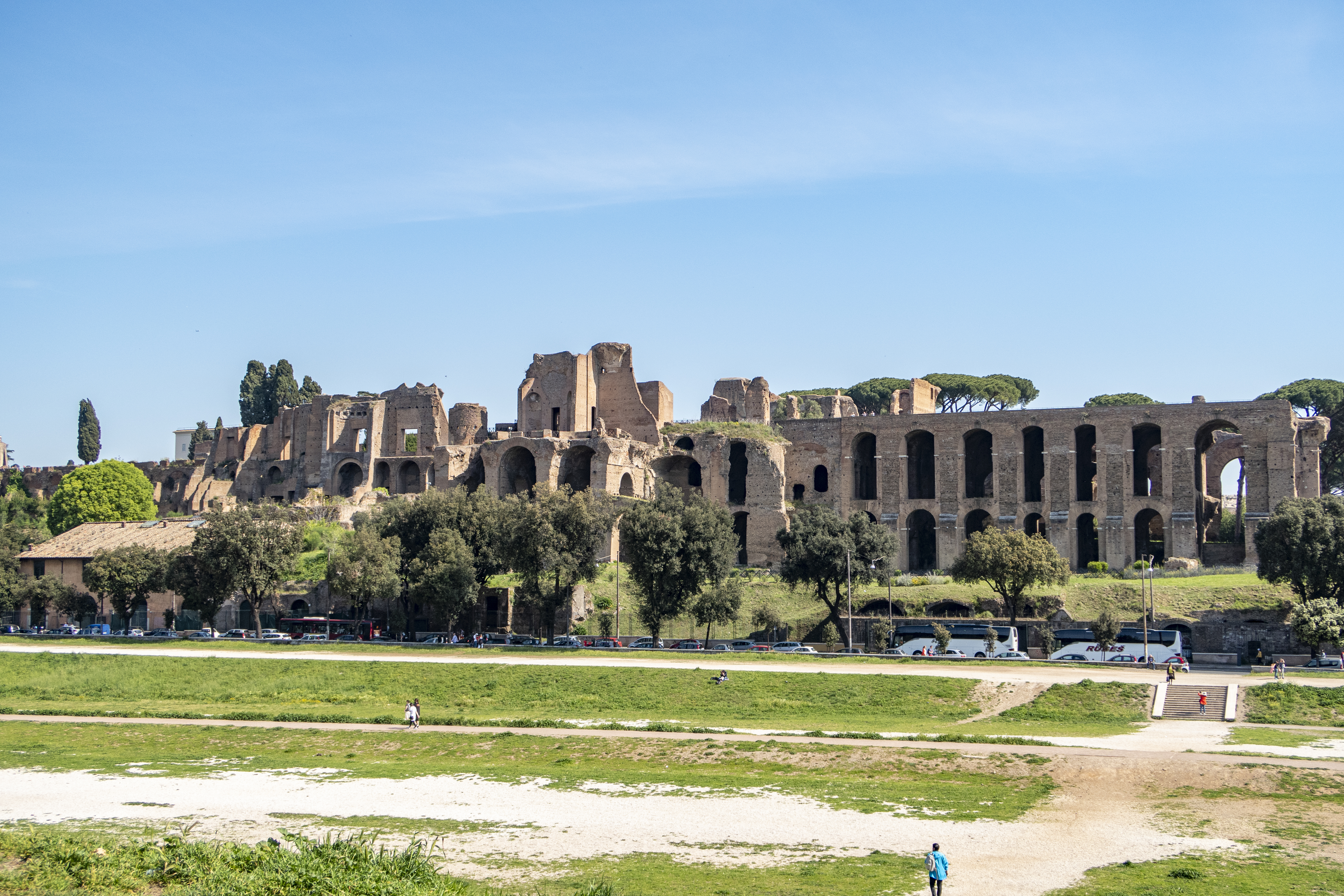
The Ancient-Imperial-Roman palaces of the Palatine, a series of palaces located in the Palatine Hill, express power and wealth of emperors from Augustus until the 4th century.

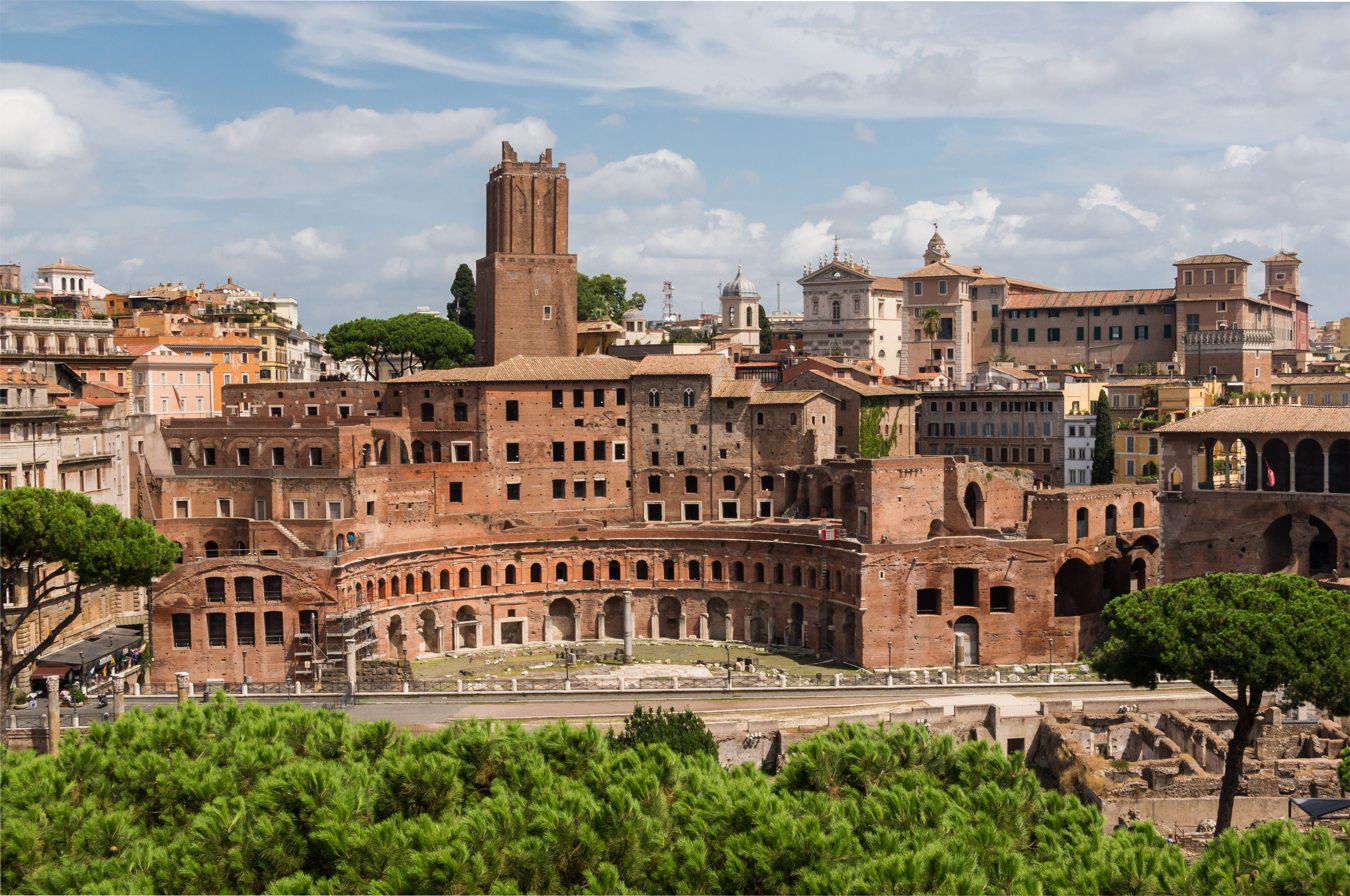
The Imperial fora belong to a series of monumental fora (public squares) constructed in Rome by the emperors. Also seen in the image is Trajan's Market.

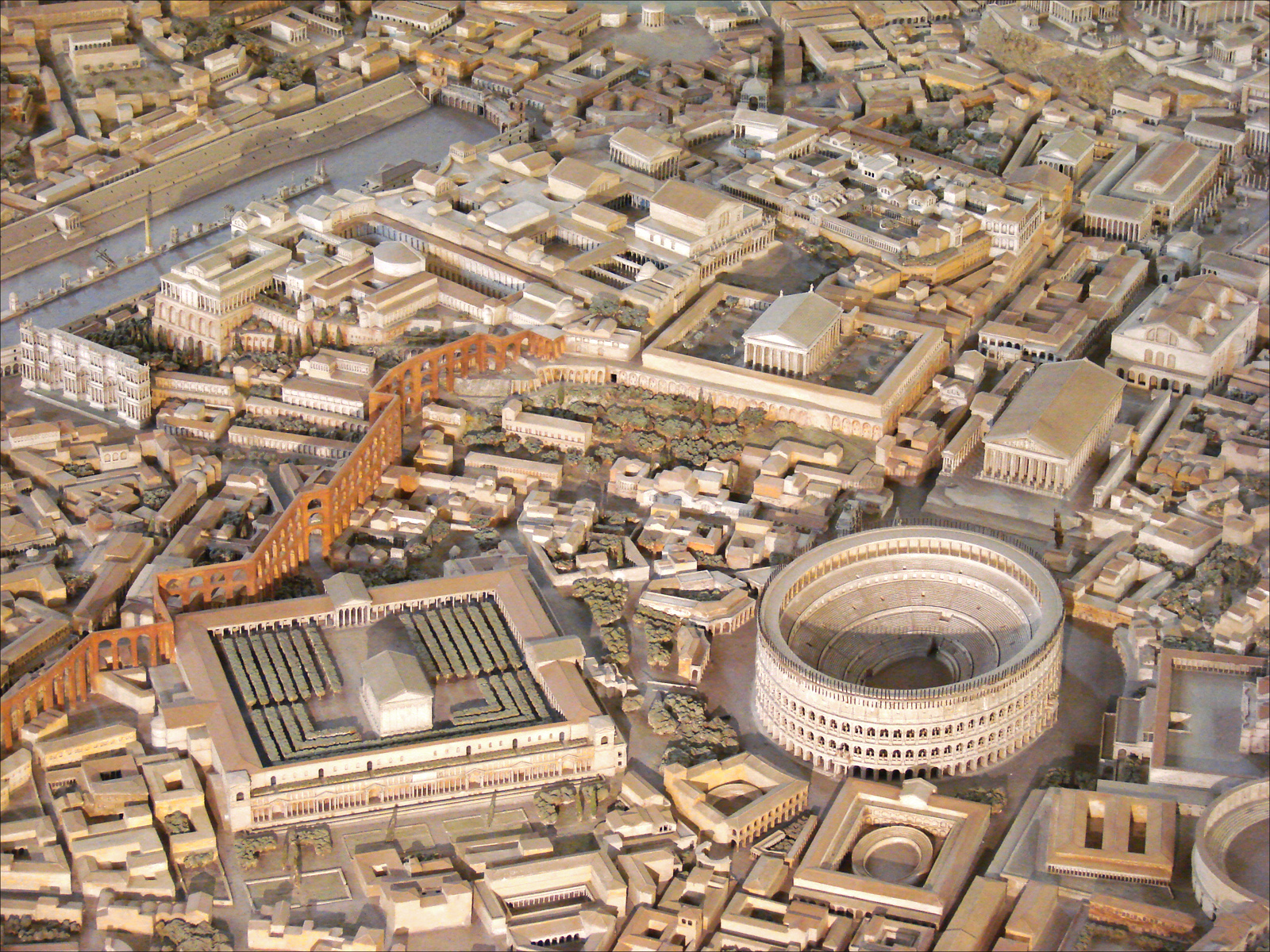
Model of Imperial Rome at the Museum of Roman Civilization in Rome. The Temple of Claudius is situated to the south (left) of the Colosseum.

In 27 BC, Octavian was named Augustus and princeps, founding the principate, a diarchy between the princeps and the senate. Over time, the new monarch came to be known as the imperator (whence emperor), meaning 'commander'. During the reign of Nero, two-thirds of the city was ruined after the Great Fire of Rome, and the persecution of Christians commenced. Rome's empire reached its greatest expansion in the second century under the Emperor Trajan. Rome was known as the Caput Mundi, i.e. the capital of the known world, an expression which had already been used in the Republican period. During its first two centuries, the empire was ruled by emperors of the Julio-Claudian, Flavian and Antonine dynasties. This time was also characterised by the spread of the Christian religion, preached by Jesus Christ in Judea in the first half of the first century (under Tiberius) and popularised by his apostles through the empire and beyond. The Antonine age is considered the zenith of the Empire, whose territory ranged from the Atlantic Ocean to the Euphrates and from Britain to Egypt.

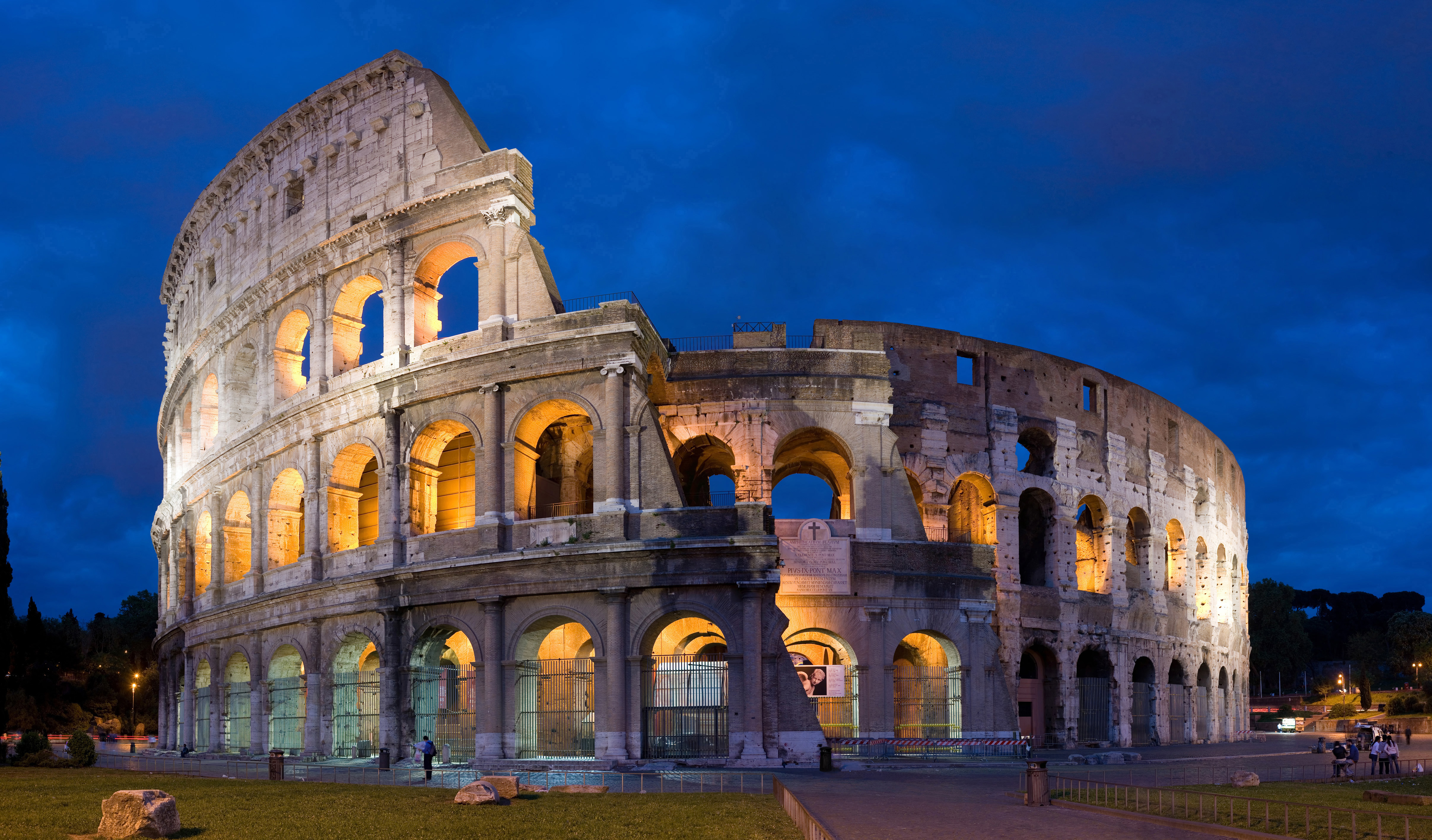
Colosseum at dusk

After the end of the Severan dynasty in AD 235, the Empire entered into a 50-year period known as the Crisis of the Third Century, during which numerous generals fought for power and the central authority in Rome weakened dramatically. Around the same time, the Plague of Cyprian (c. 250–270) afflicted the Mediterranean. Instability caused economic deterioration, and there was a rapid rise in inflation as the government debased the currency in order to meet expenses. The Germanic tribes along the Rhine and north of the Balkans made serious uncoordinated incursions that were more like giant raiding parties rather than attempts to settle. The Persian Empire invaded from the east several times during the 230s to 260s but were eventually defeated. The civil wars ended in 285 with the final victory of Diocletian, who undertook the restoration of the State. He ended the Principate and introduced a new authoritarian model known as the Dominate, derived from his title of dominus ('lord'). His most marked feature was the unprecedented intervention of the State down to the city level: whereas the State had submitted a tax demand to a city and allowed it to allocate the charges, from his reign the State did this down to the village level. In a vain attempt to control inflation, he imposed price controls which did not last.

Diocletian divided the empire in 286, ruling over the eastern half from Nicomedia, while his co-emperor Maximian ruled the western half from Mediolanum (when not on the move). The empire was further divided in 293, when Diocletian named two caesar, one for each augustus (emperor). Diocletian tried to turn into a system of non-dynastic succession, similar to the Antonine dynasty. Upon abdication in 305, both caesars succeeded and they, in turn, appointed two colleagues for themselves. However, a series of civil wars between rival claimants to power resulted in the unification of the empire under Constantine the Great in 324. Hereditary succession was restored, but the east–west division was maintained. Constantine undertook a major reform of the bureaucracy, not by changing the structure but by rationalising the competencies of the several ministries. The so-called Edict of Milan of 313, actually a fragment of a letter from his co-emperor Licinius to the governors of the eastern provinces, granted freedom of worship to everyone, including Christians, and ordered the restoration of confiscated church properties upon petition to the newly created vicars of dioceses. He funded the building of several churches and allowed clergy to act as arbitrators in civil suits (a measure that did not outlast him but which was restored in part much later). In 330, he transformed Byzantium into Constantinople, which became his new capital. However, it was not officially anything more than an imperial residence like Mediolanum, Augusta Treverorum, or Nicomedia until given a city prefect in 359 by Constantius II.

Constantine, following Diocletian's reforms, regionalised the administration, which fundamentally changed the way it was governed by creating regional dioceses. The existence of regional fiscal units from 286 served as the model for this unprecedented innovation. The emperor quickened the process of removing military command from governors. Henceforth, civilian administration and military command would be separate. He gave governors more fiscal duties and placed them in charge of the army logistical support system as an attempt to control it by removing the support system from its control.

Christianity in the form of the Nicene Creed became the official religion of the empire in 380, via the Edict of Thessalonica issued in the name of three emperors – Gratian, Valentinian II, and Theodosius I – with Theodosius clearly the driving force behind it. He was the last emperor of a unified empire: after his death in 395, his young children, Honorius and Arcadius, inherited the western and eastern empires respectively. The seat of government in the Western Roman Empire was transferred to Ravenna in 408, but from 450 the emperors mostly resided in Rome.

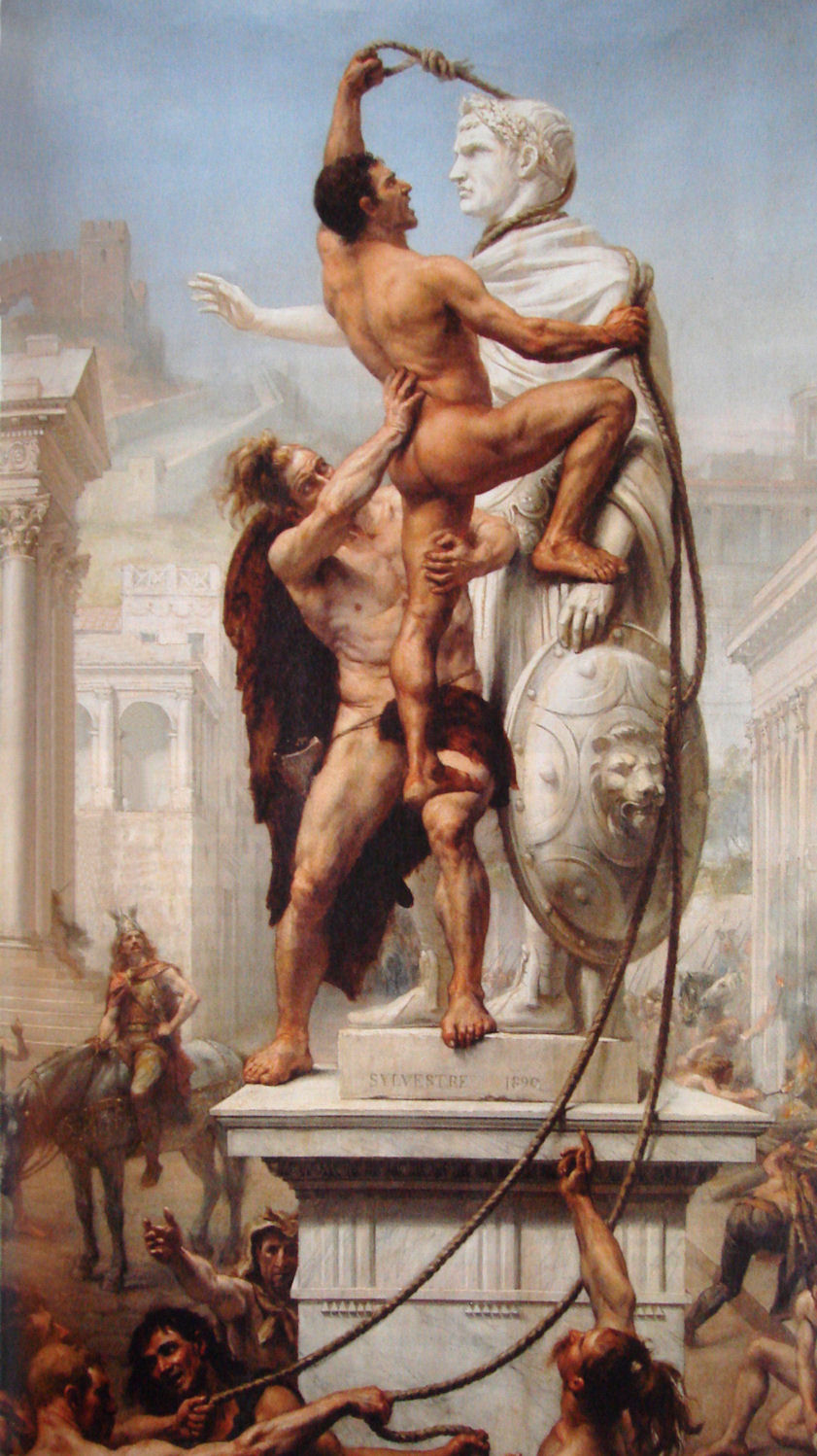
The Visigoths sacking Rome in 410, by Joseph-Noël Sylvestre (1890), the first time in c. 800 years that Rome had fallen to a foreign enemy

Rome, which had lost its central role in the administration of the empire, was sacked in 410 by the Visigoths led by Alaric I, but very little physical damage was done, most of which was repaired. What could not be so easily replaced were portable items such as artwork in precious metals and items for domestic use (loot). The popes embellished the city with large basilicas, such as Santa Maria Maggiore (with the collaboration of the emperors). The population of the city had fallen from 800,000 to 450–500,000 by the time the city was sacked in 455 by Genseric, king of the Vandals. The weak emperors of the fifth century could not stop the decay, leading to the deposition of Romulus Augustus, who resided on Ravenna, on 4 September 476. This marked the end of the Western Roman Empire and, for many historians, the beginning of the Middle Ages.

The decline of the city's population was caused by the loss of grain shipments from North Africa, from 440 onward, and the unwillingness of the senatorial class to maintain donations to support a population that was too large for the resources available. Even so, strenuous efforts were made to maintain the monumental centre, the Palatine, and the imperial baths, which continued to function until the Gothic siege of 537. The Baths of Constantine on the Quirinal Hill were even repaired in 443, and the extent of the damage exaggerated and dramatised.

However, the city gave an appearance overall of shabbiness and decay because of the large abandoned areas due to population decline. The population declined to 500,000 by 452 and 100,000 by AD 500 (perhaps larger, though no certain figure can be known). After the Gothic siege of 537, the population dropped to 30,000 but had risen to 90,000 by the papacy of Gregory the Great. The population decline coincided with the general collapse of urban life in the West in the fifth and sixth centuries, with few exceptions. Subsidized state grain distributions to the poorer members of society continued right through the sixth century and probably prevented the population from falling further. The figure of 450,000–500,000 is based on the amount of pork, 3,629,000 lbs. distributed to poorer Romans during five winter months at the rate of five Roman lbs per person per month, enough for 145,000 persons or 1/4 or 1/3 of the total population. Grain distribution to 80,000 ticket holders at the same time suggests 400,000 (Augustus set the number at 200,000 or one-fifth of the population).

=== Middle Ages ===
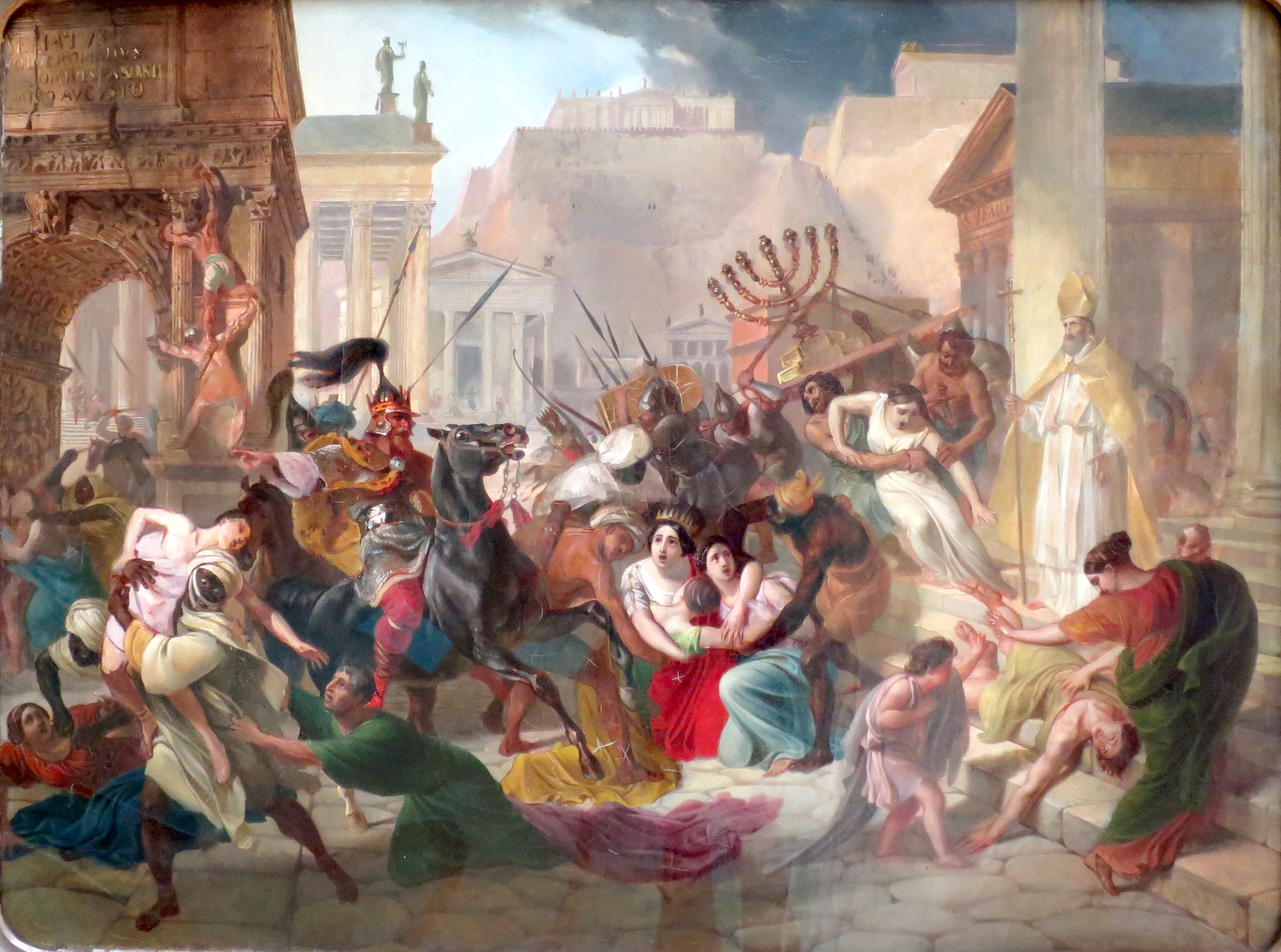
The Vandals sacking Rome in 455, by Karl Briullov (1830s)

After the fall of the Western Roman Empire in AD 476, Rome was first under the control of Odoacer and then became part of the Ostrogothic Kingdom before returning to East Roman control after the Gothic War, which devastated the city in 546 and 550. Its population declined from more than a million in AD 210 to 500,000 in AD 273 to 35,000 after the Gothic War (535–554), reducing the sprawling city to groups of inhabited buildings interspersed among large areas of ruins, vegetation, vineyards and market gardens. It is generally thought the population of the city until AD 300 was 1 million (estimates range from 2 million to 750,000) declining to 750–800,000 in AD 400, then 450–500,000 in AD 450 and down to 80–100,000 in AD 500 (though it may have been twice this).

The Bishop of Rome, called the Pope, was important since the early days of Christianity because of the martyrdom of both the apostles Peter and Paul there. The Bishops of Rome were also seen (and still are seen by Catholics) as the successors of Peter, who is considered the first Bishop of Rome. The city thus became of increasing importance as the centre of the Catholic Church.

After the Lombard invasion of Italy (569–572), the city remained nominally Byzantine, but in reality, the popes pursued a policy of equilibrium between the Byzantines, the Franks, and the Lombards. In 729, the Lombard king Liutprand donated the north Latium town of Sutri to the Church, starting its temporal power. In 756, Pepin the Short, after having defeated the Lombards, gave the Pope temporal jurisdiction over the Duchy of Rome and the Exarchate of Ravenna, thus creating the Papal States. Since this period, three powers tried to rule the city: the pope, the nobility (together with the chiefs of militias, the judges, the Senate and the populace), and the Frankish king, as king of the Lombards, patricius, and Emperor. These three parties (theocratic, republican, and imperial) were a characteristic of Roman life during the entire Middle Ages. On Christmas night of 800, Charlemagne was crowned in Rome as Emperor by Pope Leo III: on that occasion, the city hosted for the first time the two powers whose struggle for control was to be a constant of the Middle Ages. This event marks the beginning of the Carolingian Empire, the first phase of the Holy Roman Empire.

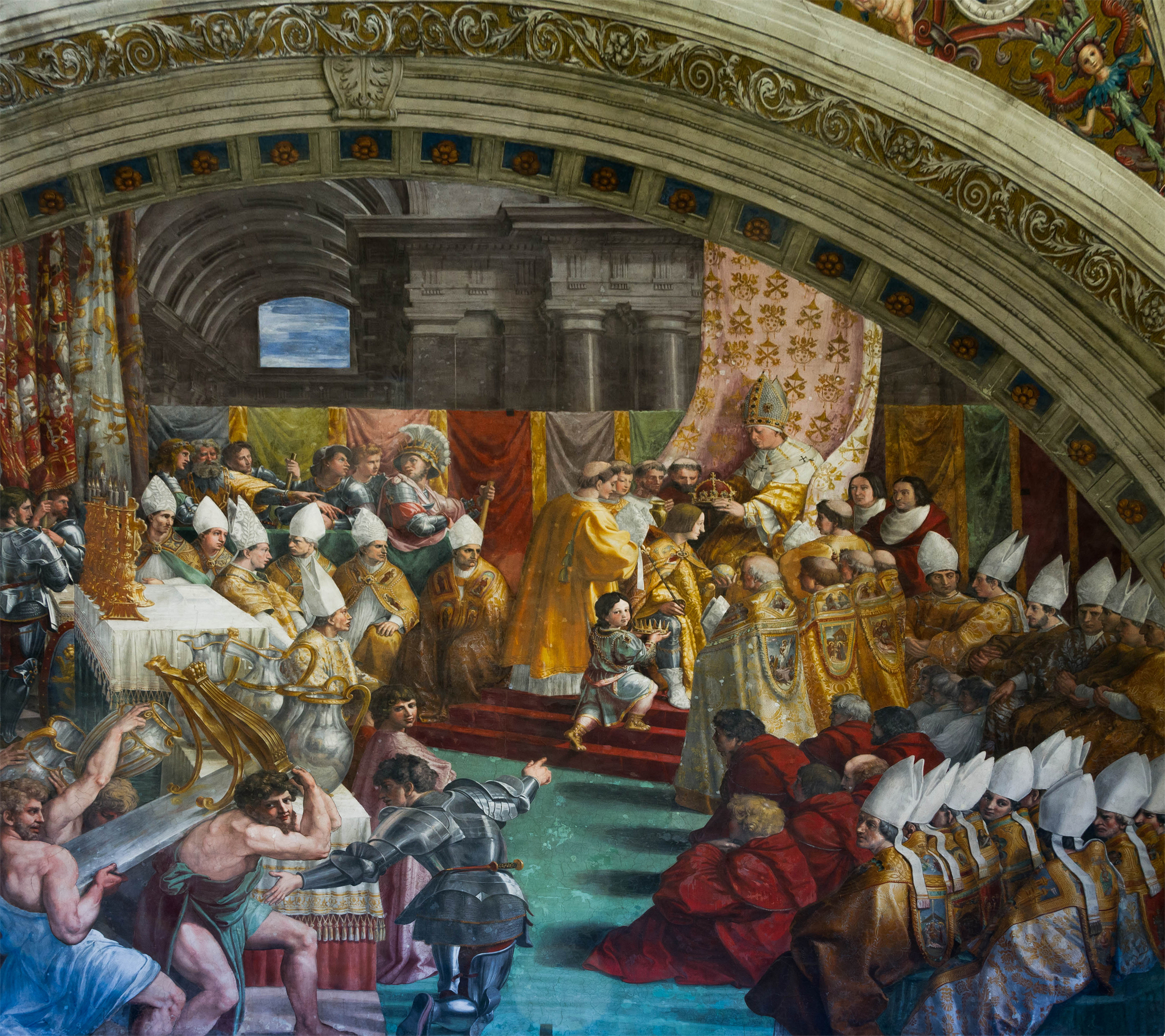
Detail from an illustration by Raphael, portraying the crowning of Charlemagne in Old Saint Peter's Basilica, on 25 December 800

In 846, Muslim Arabs unsuccessfully stormed the city's walls, but managed to loot St. Peter's and St. Paul's basilica, both outside the city wall. After the decay of Carolingian power, Rome fell prey to feudal chaos: several noble families fought against the pope, the emperor, and each other. This period saw the rise of figures like Theodora and her daughter Marozia, concubines and mothers of several popes, and of Crescentius, a powerful feudal lord, who fought against the Emperors Otto II and Otto III. The scandals of this period forced the papacy to reform itself: the election of the pope was reserved to the cardinals, and reform of the clergy was attempted. The driving force behind this renewal was the monk Ildebrando da Soana, who once elected pope under the name of Gregory VII became involved into the Investiture Controversy against Emperor Henry IV. Subsequently, Rome was sacked and burned by the Normans under Robert Guiscard who had entered the city in support of the Pope, then besieged in Castel Sant'Angelo.

During this period, the city was autonomously ruled by a senatore or patrizio. In the 12th century, this administration, like other European cities, evolved into the commune, a new form of social organisation controlled by the new wealthy classes. Pope Lucius II fought against the Roman commune, and the struggle was continued by his successor Pope Eugenius III: by this stage, the commune, allied with the aristocracy, was supported by Arnaldo da Brescia, a monk who was a religious and social reformer. After the pope's death, Arnaldo was taken prisoner by Pope Adrian IV, which marked the end of the commune's autonomy. Under Pope Innocent III, whose reign marked the apogee of the papacy, the commune liquidated the senate, and replaced it with a Senatore, who was subject to the pope.

In this period, the papacy played a role of secular importance in Western Europe, often acting as arbitrators between Christian monarchs and exercising additional political powers.

In 1266, Charles of Anjou, who was heading south to fight the Hohenstaufen on behalf of the pope, was appointed Senator. Charles founded the Sapienza, the university of Rome. In that period the pope died, and the cardinals, summoned in Viterbo, could not agree on his successor. This angered the people of the city, who then unroofed the building where they met and imprisoned them until they had nominated the new pope; this marked the birth of the conclave. In this period the city was also shattered by continuous fights between the aristocratic families: Annibaldi, Caetani, Colonna, Orsini, Conti, nested in their fortresses built above ancient Roman edifices, fought each other to control the papacy.

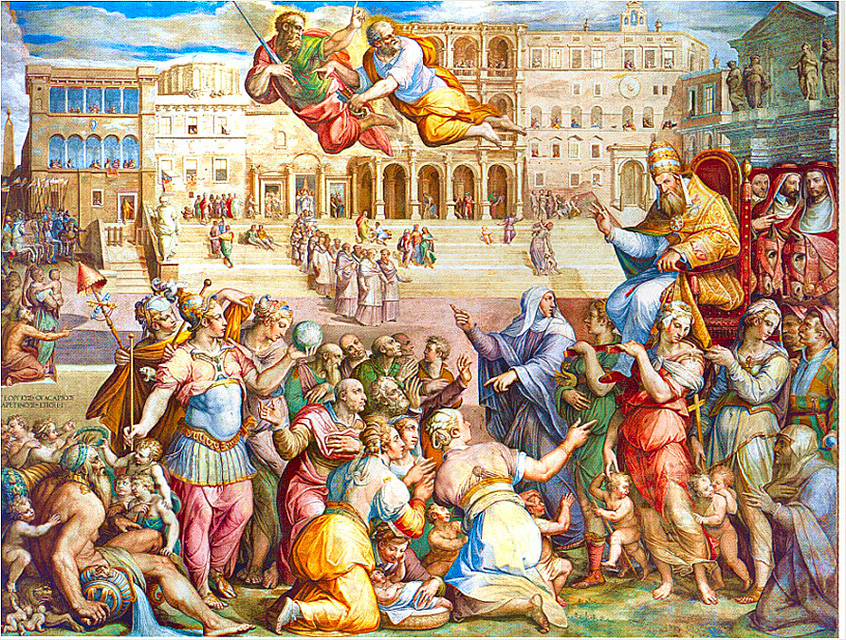
Pope Gregory XI returned to Rome in 1376 and ended the Avignon Papacy.

Pope Boniface VIII of the Caetani family was the last pope to fight for the church's universal domain; he proclaimed a crusade against the Colonna family and, in 1300, called for the first Jubilee of Christianity, which brought millions of pilgrims to Rome. However, his hopes were crushed by the French king Philip the Fair, who took him prisoner and held him hostage for three days at Anagni. The Pope was able to return to Rome, but died a month later, it was said of shock and grief. Afterwards, a new pope faithful to the French was elected, and the papacy was briefly relocated to Avignon (1309–1377). During this period Rome was neglected, until a plebeian man, Cola di Rienzo, came to power. An idealist and a lover of ancient Rome, Cola dreamed about a rebirth of the Roman Empire: after assuming power with the title of Tribuno, his reforms were rejected by the populace. Forced to flee, Cola returned as part of the entourage of Cardinal Albornoz, who was charged with restoring the Church's power in Italy. Back in power for a short time, Cola was soon lynched by the populace, and Albornoz took possession of the city. In 1377, Rome became the seat of the papacy again under Gregory XI. The return of the pope to Rome in that year unleashed the Western Schism (1377–1418), and for the next forty years, the city was affected by the divisions which rocked the Church.

=== Early modern history ===
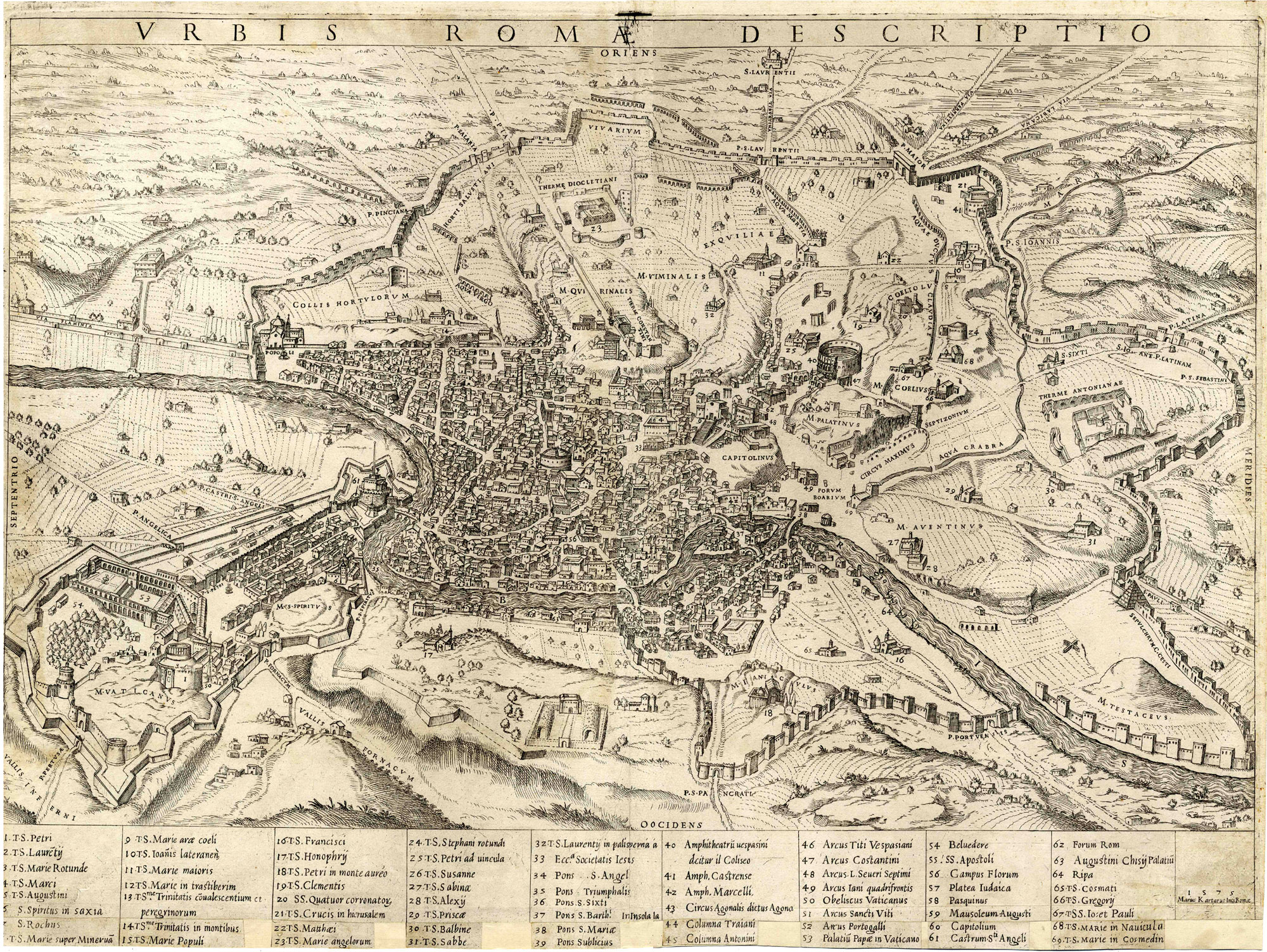
Almost 500 years old, this map of Rome by Mario Cartaro (from 1575) shows the city's primary monuments.

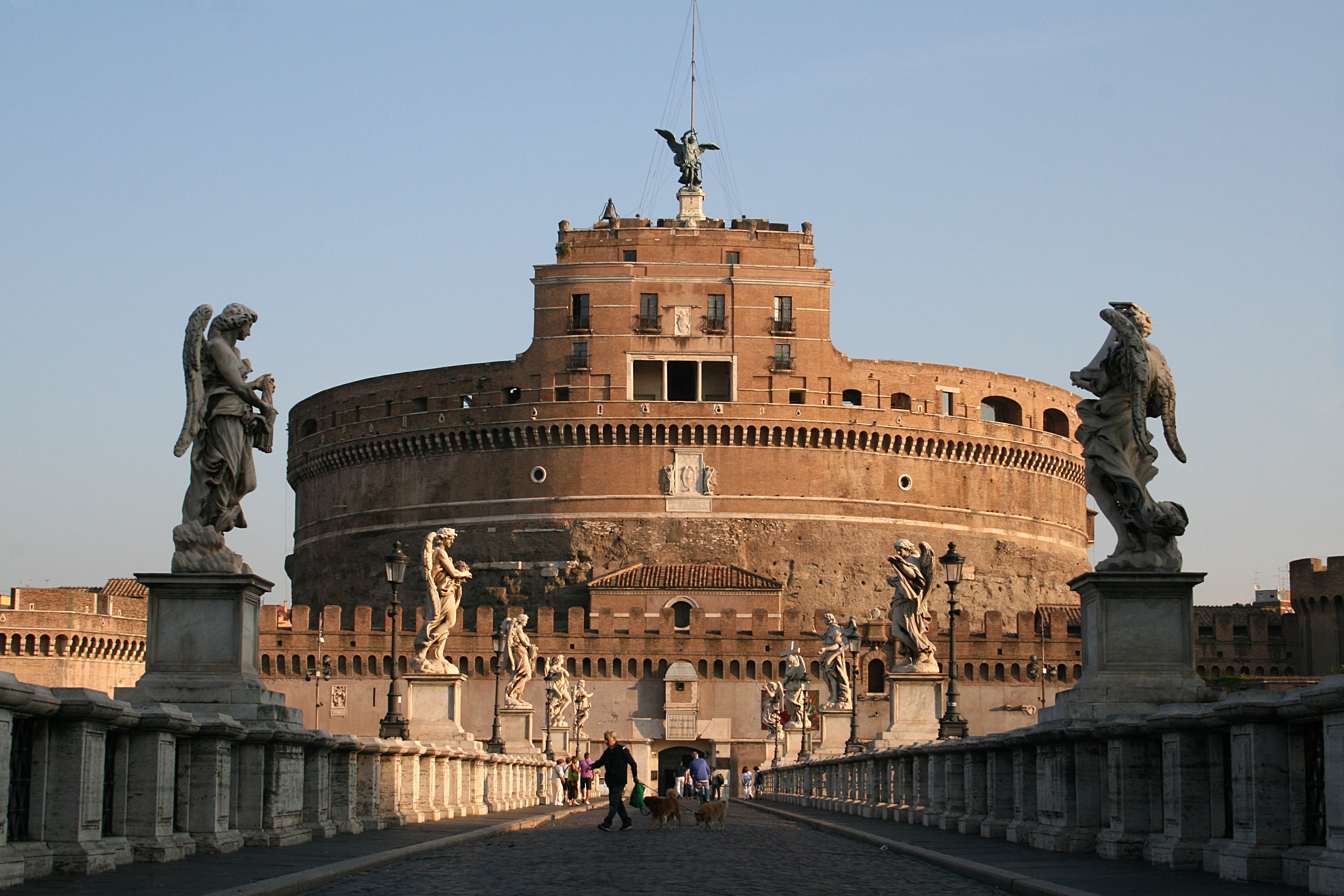
Castel Sant'Angelo, or Hadrian's Mausoleum, is a Roman monument built in 134 AD, radically altered in the Middle Ages and the Renaissance, and crowned with 16th and 17th-century statues.

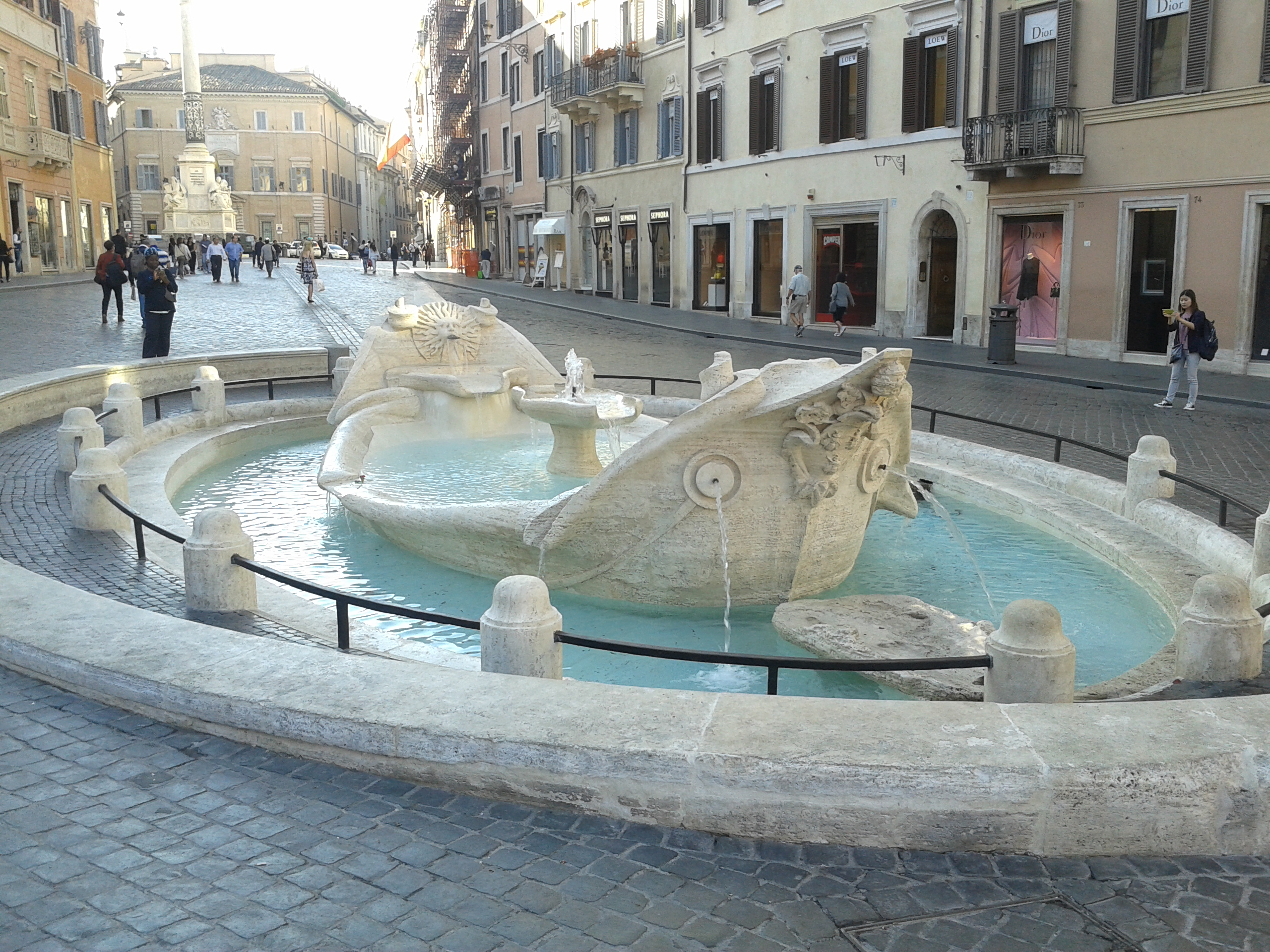
Fontana della Barcaccia, created by Gian Lorenzo Bernini in 1629

In 1418, the Council of Constance settled the Western Schism, and a Roman pope, Martin V, was elected. This brought to Rome a century of internal peace, which marked the beginning of the Renaissance. The ruling popes until the first half of the 16th century, from Nicholas V, founder of the Vatican Library, to Pius II, humanist and literate, from Sixtus IV, a warrior pope, to Alexander VI, immoral and nepotist, from Julius II, soldier and patron, to Leo X Medici, who gave his name to this period ("the century of Leo X"), all devoted their energy to the greatness and the beauty of the Eternal City and to the patronage of the arts.

During those years, the centre of the Italian Renaissance moved to Rome from Florence. Majestic works, as the new Saint Peter's Basilica, the Sistine Chapel and Ponte Sisto (the first bridge to be built across the Tiber since antiquity, although on Roman foundations) were created. To accomplish that, the Popes engaged the best artists of the time, including Michelangelo, Perugino, Raphael, Ghirlandaio, Luca Signorelli, Botticelli, and Cosimo Rosselli.

The period was also infamous for papal corruption, with many Popes fathering children, and engaging in nepotism and simony. The corruption of the Popes and the huge expenses for their building projects led, in part, to the Reformation and, in turn, the Counter-Reformation. Under extravagant and rich popes, Rome was transformed into a centre of art, poetry, music, literature, education and culture. Rome became able to compete with other major European cities of the time in terms of wealth, grandeur, the arts, learning and architecture.

The Renaissance period changed the face of Rome dramatically, with works like the Pietà by Michelangelo and the frescoes of the Borgia Apartments. Rome reached the highest point of splendour under Pope Julius II della Rovere (1503–1513) and his successors Leo X and Clement VII, both members of the Medici family.

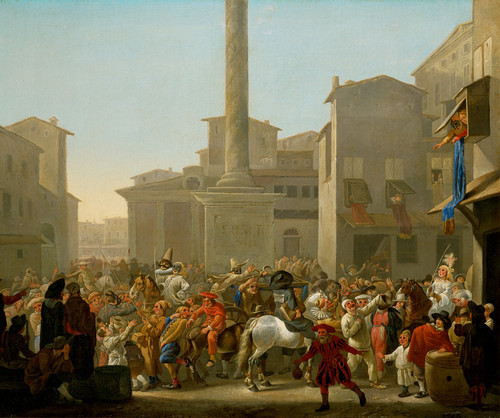
Carnival in Rome, c. 1650, by Johannes Lingelbach

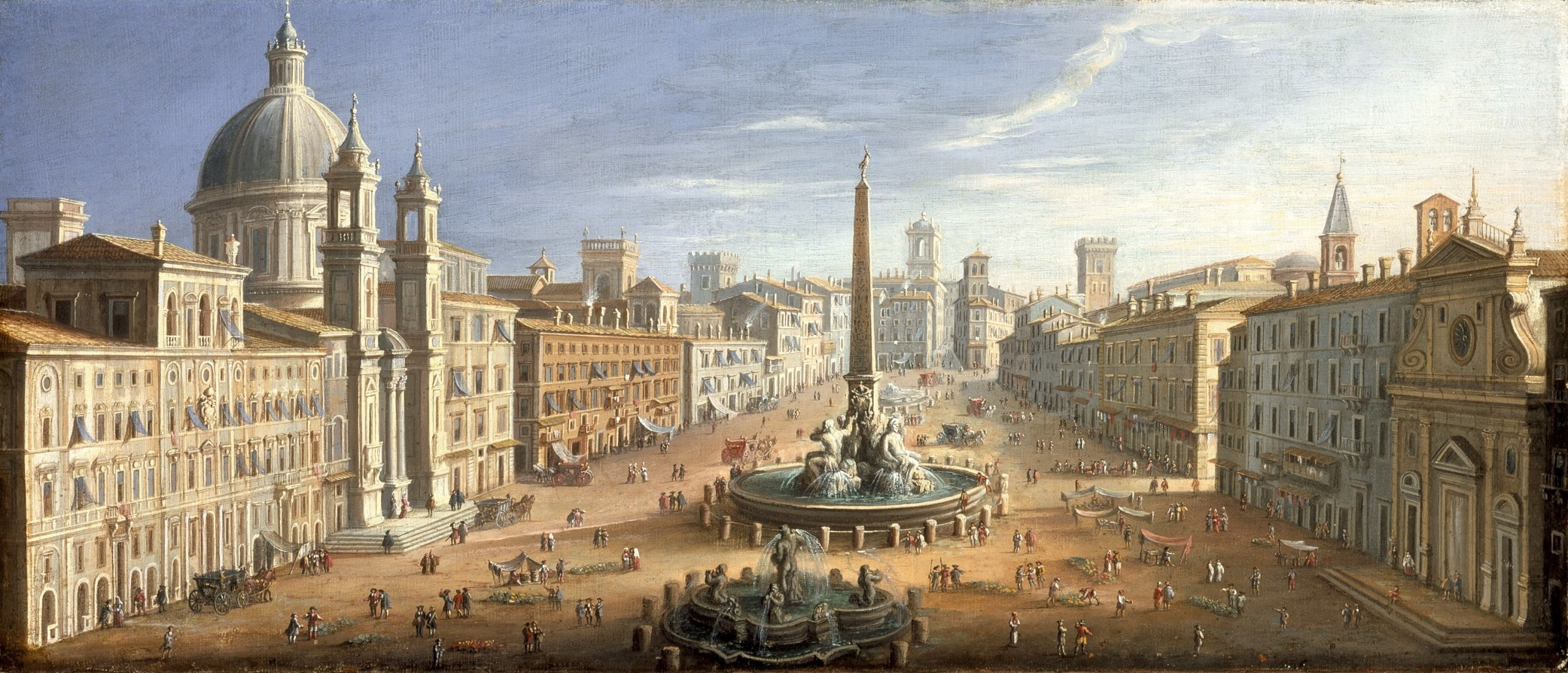
A View of the Piazza Navona, Rome, by Hendrik Frans van Lint, c. 1730

In this twenty-year period, Rome became one of the greatest centres of art in the world. The old St. Peter's Basilica built by Emperor Constantine the Great (which by then was in a dilapidated state) was demolished and a new one begun. The city hosted artists like Ghirlandaio, Perugino, Botticelli and Bramante, who built the temple of San Pietro in Montorio and planned a great project to renovate the Vatican. Raphael, who in Rome became one of the most famous painters of Italy, created frescoes in the Villa Farnesina, the Raphael's Rooms, plus many other famous paintings. Michelangelo started the decoration of the ceiling of the Sistine Chapel and executed the famous statue of the Moses for the tomb of Julius II.

Its economy was rich, with the presence of several Tuscan bankers, including Agostino Chigi, who was a friend of Raphael and a patron of arts. Before his early death, Raphael also promoted for the first time the preservation of the ancient ruins. The War of the League of Cognac caused the first plunder of the city in more than five hundred years since the previous sack; in 1527, the Landsknechts of Emperor Charles V sacked the city, bringing an abrupt end to the golden age of the Renaissance in Rome.

Beginning with the Council of Trent in 1545, the Church began the Counter-Reformation in response to the Reformation, a large-scale questioning of the Church's authority on spiritual matters and governmental affairs. This loss of confidence led to major shifts of power away from the Church. Under the popes from Pius IV Medici to Sixtus V, Rome became the centre of a reformed Catholicism and saw the building of new monuments which celebrated the papacy. The popes and cardinals of the 17th and early 18th centuries continued the movement by having the city's landscape enriched with baroque buildings.

This was another nepotistic age; the new aristocratic families (Barberini, Pamphili, Chigi, Rospigliosi, Altieri, Odescalchi) were protected by their respective popes, who built huge baroque palazzi for their relatives. During the Age of Enlightenment, new ideas reached the Eternal City, where the papacy supported archaeological studies and improved the people's welfare. But not everything went well for the Church during the Counter-Reformation. There were setbacks in the attempts to assert the Church's power, a notable example being in 1773 when Pope Clement XIV was forced by secular powers to have the Jesuit order suppressed.

=== Late modern and contemporary ===
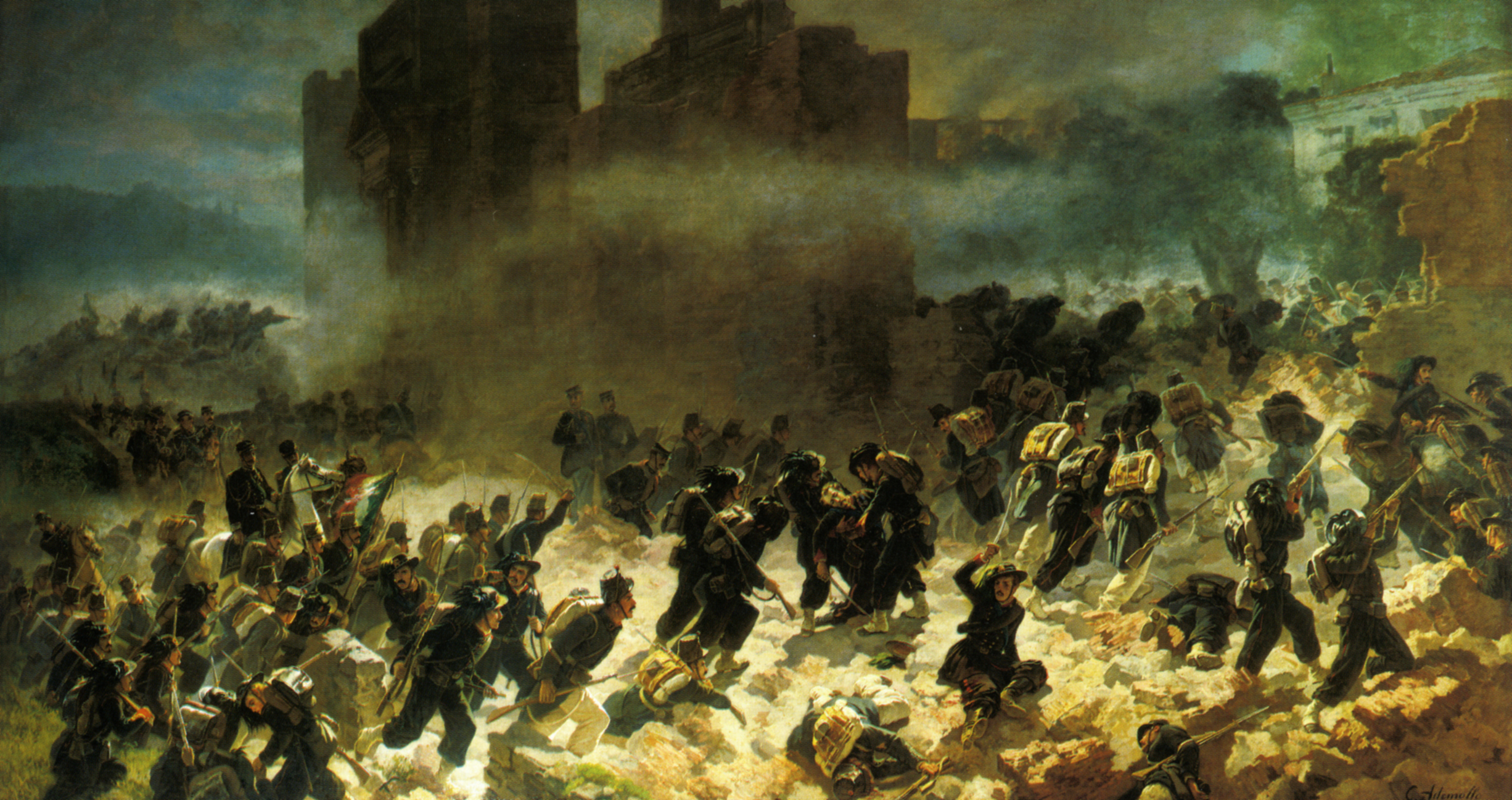
Bersaglieri troops breaching the Aurelian Walls at Porta Pia during the Capture of Rome (1870), the final event of the Italian unification. Painting by Carlo Ademollo.

The rule of the Popes was interrupted by the short-lived Roman Republic (1798–1800), which was established under the influence of the French Revolution. The Papal States were restored in June 1800, but during Napoleon's reign Rome was annexed as a Département of the French Empire: first as Département du Tibre (1809–1810) and then as Département Rome (1810–1814). After the fall of Napoleon, the Papal States were reconstituted by a decision of the Congress of Vienna of 1814.

In 1849, a second Roman Republic was proclaimed during a year of revolutions in 1848. Two of the most influential figures of the Italian unification, Giuseppe Mazzini and Giuseppe Garibaldi, fought for the short-lived republic.

Rome then became the focus of hopes of Italian reunification after the rest of Italy was united as the Kingdom of Italy in 1861 with the temporary capital in Florence. That year Rome was declared the capital of Italy even though it was still under the Pope's control. During the 1860s, the last vestiges of the Papal States were under French protection thanks to the foreign policy of Napoleon III. French troops were stationed in the region under Papal control. In 1870 the French troops were withdrawn due to the outbreak of the Franco-Prussian War. Italian troops were able to capture Rome entering the city through a breach near Porta Pia. Pope Pius IX declared himself a prisoner in the Vatican. In 1871 the capital of Italy was moved from Florence to Rome. In 1870 the population of the city was 212,000, all of whom lived with the area circumscribed by the ancient city, and in 1920, the population was 660,000. A significant portion lived outside the walls in the north and across the Tiber in the Vatican area.

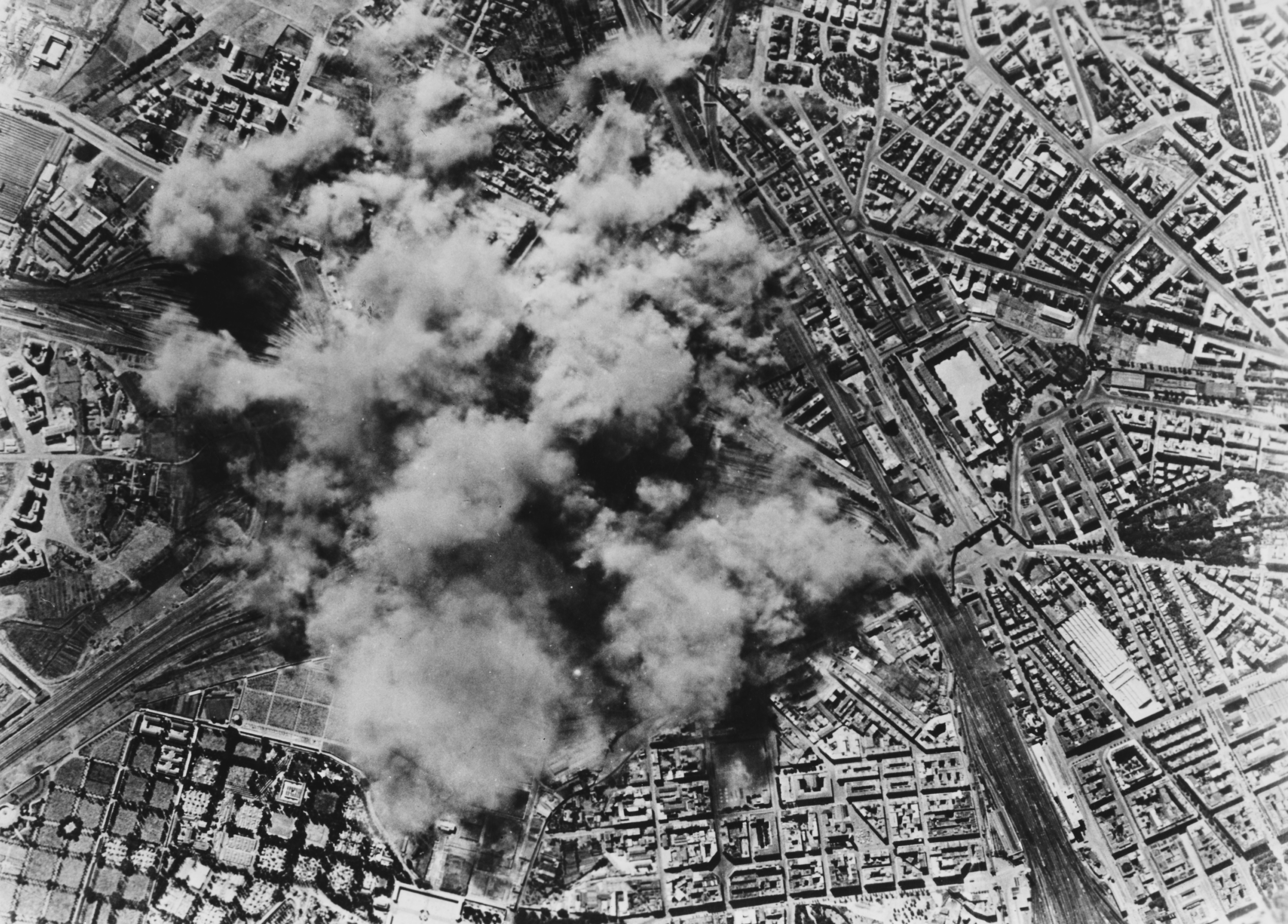
Bombardment of Rome by Allied planes, 1943

Soon after World War I in late 1922 Rome witnessed the rise of Italian Fascism led by Benito Mussolini, who led a march on the city. He did away with democracy by 1926, eventually declaring a new Italian Empire and allying Italy with Nazi Germany in 1938. Mussolini demolished fairly large parts of the city centre in order to build wide avenues and squares which were supposed to celebrate the fascist regime and the resurgence and glorification of classical Rome. The interwar period saw a rapid growth in the city's population which surpassed one million inhabitants soon after 1930. During World War II, due to the art treasuries and the presence of the Vatican, Rome largely escaped the tragic destiny of other European cities. However, on 19 July 1943, the San Lorenzo district was subject to Allied bombing raids, resulting in about 3,000 fatalities and 11,000 injuries, of whom another 1,500 died. Mussolini was arrested on 25 July 1943. On the date of the Italian Armistice 8 September 1943 the city was occupied by the Germans. Allied bombing raids continued throughout 1943 and extended into 1944. Rome was liberated on 4 June 1944.

Rome developed greatly after the war as part of the "Italian economic miracle" of post-war reconstruction and modernisation in the 1950s and early 1960s. During this period, the years of la dolce vita ("the sweet life"), Rome became a fashionable city, with popular classic films such as Ben Hur, Quo Vadis, Roman Holiday and La Dolce Vita filmed in the city's iconic Cinecittà Studios. The rising trend in population growth continued until the mid-1980s when the comune had more than 2.8 million residents. After this, the population declined slowly as people began to move to nearby suburbs.

== Geography ==
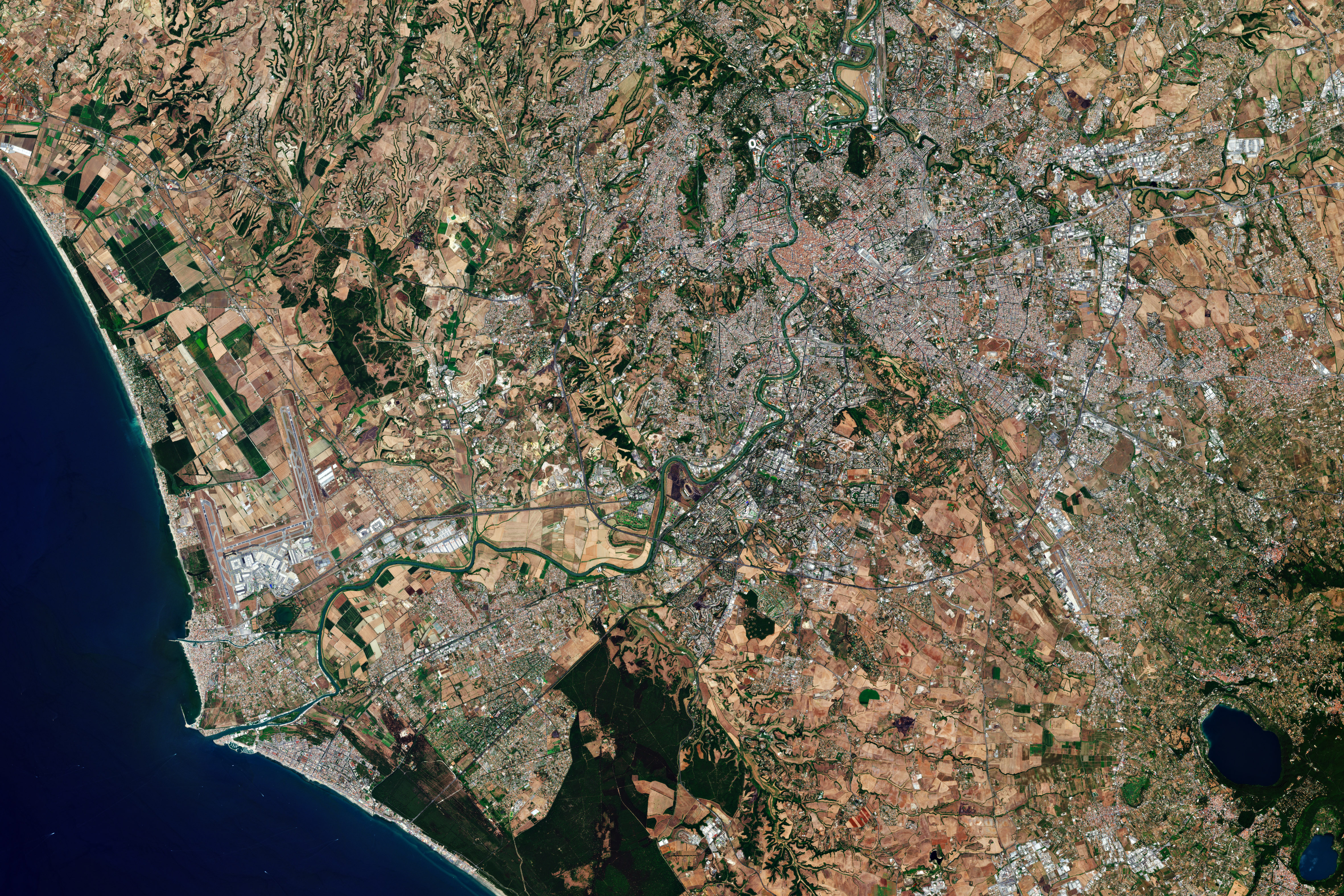
Satellite image of Rome

Rome is in the Lazio region of central Italy on the Tiber (Italian: Tevere) river. The original settlement developed on hills that faced onto a ford beside the Tiber Island, the only natural ford of the river in this area. The Rome of the Kings was built on seven hills: the Aventine Hill, the Caelian Hill, the Capitoline Hill, the Esquiline Hill, the Palatine Hill, the Quirinal Hill, and the Viminal Hill. Modern Rome is also crossed by another river, the Aniene, which flows into the Tiber north of the historic centre.

Although the city centre is about 24 km (15 mi) inland from the Tyrrhenian Sea, the city territory extends to the shore, where the south-western district of Ostia is located. The altitude of the central part of Rome ranges from 13 m (43 ft) above sea level (at the base of the Pantheon) to 139 m (456 ft) above sea level (the peak of Monte Mario). The Comune of Rome covers an overall area of about 1,285 km^{2} (496 sq mi), including many green areas.

=== Parks and gardens ===
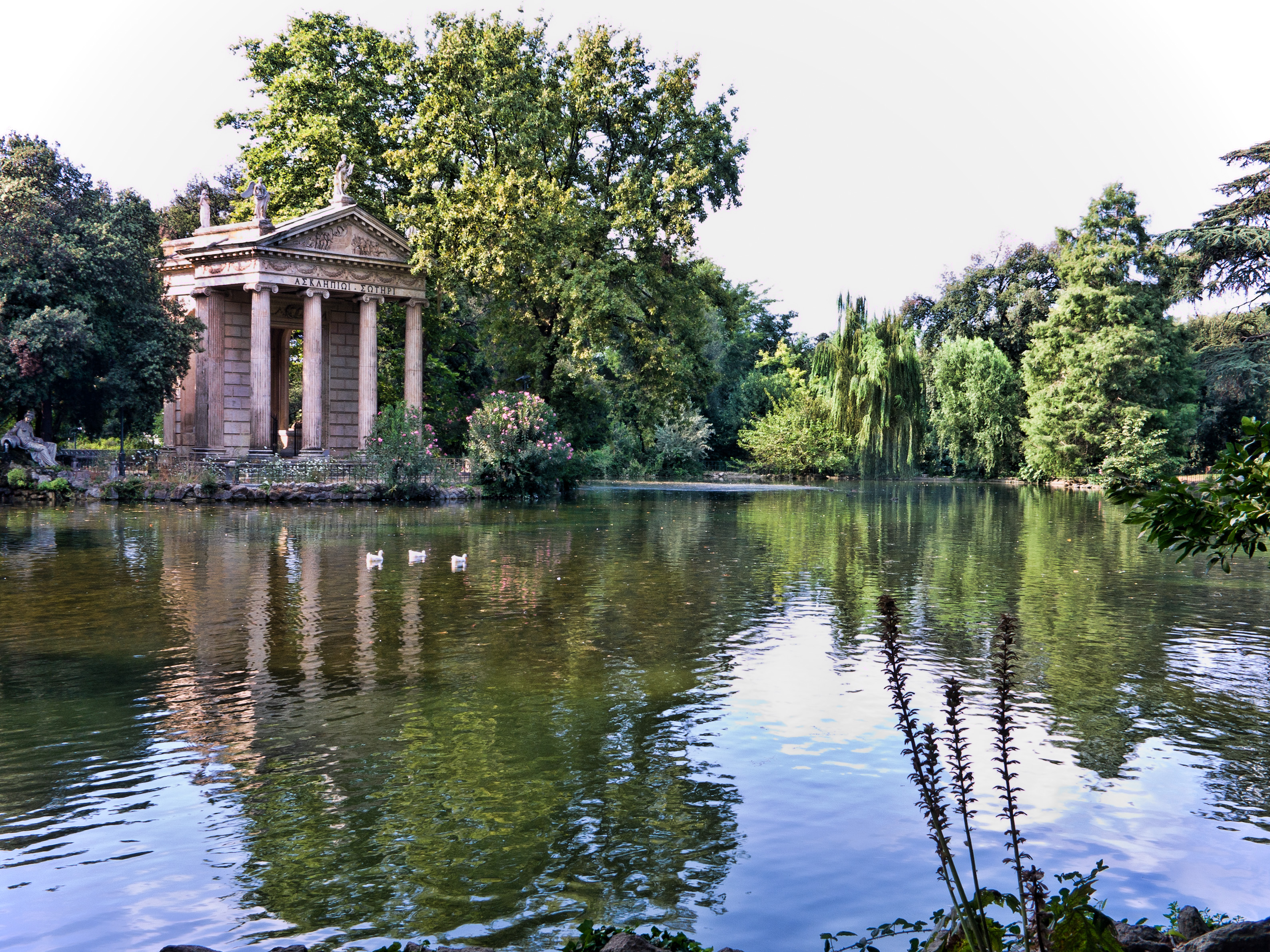
The Temple of Aesculapius, in the Villa Borghese gardens

Public parks and nature reserves cover a large area in Rome, and the city has one of the largest areas of green space among European capitals. The most notable part of this green space is represented by the large number of villas and landscaped gardens created by the Italian aristocracy. While most of the parks surrounding the villas were destroyed during the building boom of the late 19th century, some of them remain. The most notable of these are the Villa Borghese, Villa Ada, and Villa Doria Pamphili. Villa Doria Pamphili is west of the Janiculum Hill, comprising some 1.8 km^{2} (0.7 sq mi). The Villa Sciarra is on the hill, with playgrounds for children and shaded walking areas. In the nearby area of Trastevere, the Orto Botanico (Botanical Garden) is a cool and shady green space. The old Roman hippodrome (Circus Maximus) is another large green space: it has few trees but is overlooked by the Palatine and the Rose Garden ('roseto comunale'). Nearby is the lush Villa Celimontana, close to the gardens surrounding the Baths of Caracalla. The Villa Borghese garden is the best known large green space in Rome, with famous art galleries among its shaded walks. Overlooking Piazza del Popolo and the Spanish Steps are the gardens of the Pincio and Villa Medici. There is also a notable pine wood at Castelfusano, near Ostia. Rome also has a number of regional parks of much more recent origin, including the Pineto Regional Park and the Appian Way Regional Park. There are also nature reserves at Marcigliana and at Tenuta di Castelporziano.

=== Climate ===
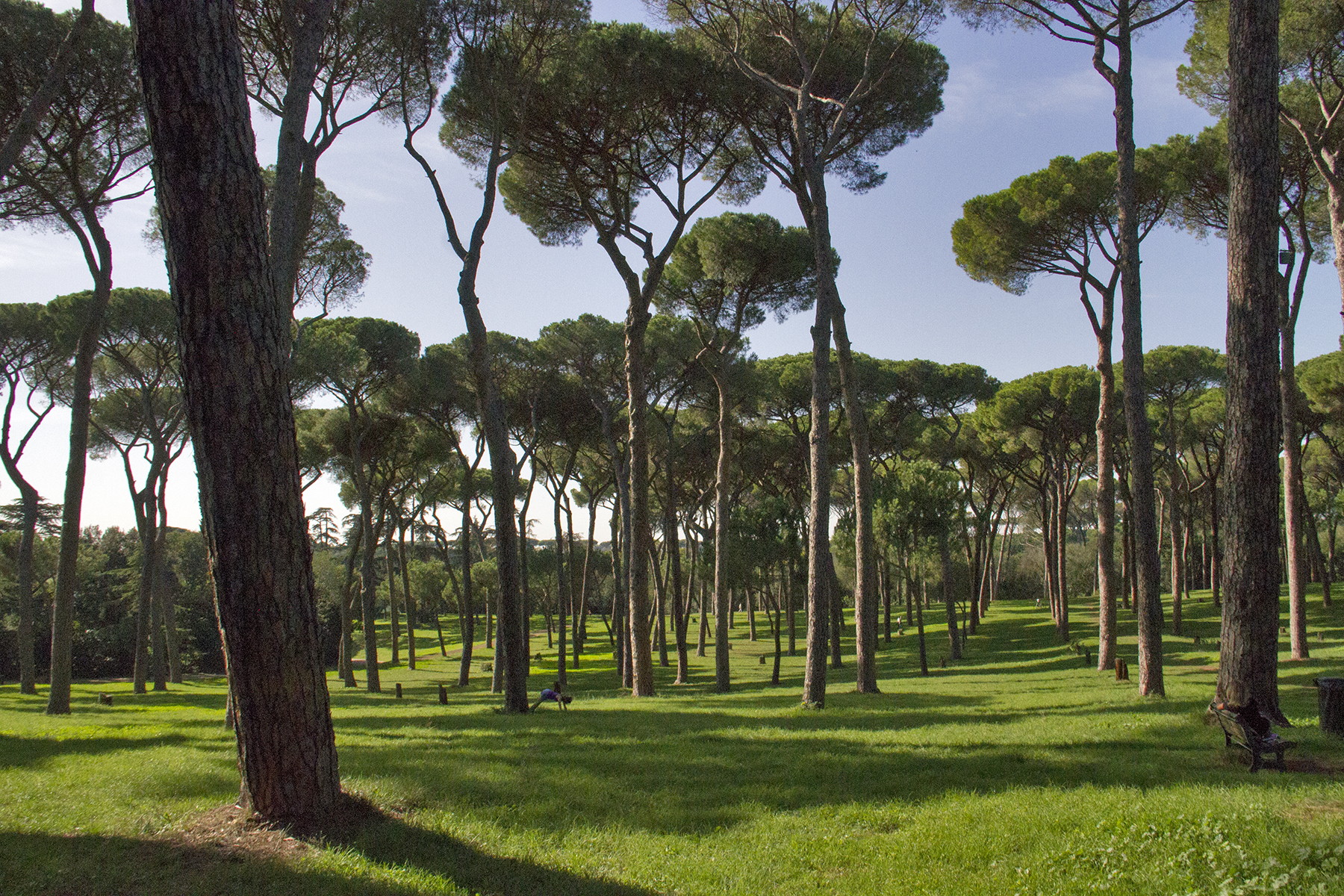
Stone pines in the Villa Doria Pamphili

Rome has a Mediterranean climate (Köppen climate classification: Csa), with hot, dry summers and mild, humid winters.

Its average annual temperature is above 21 °C (70 °F) during the day and 9 °C (48 °F) at night. In the coldest month, January, the average temperature is 12.6 °C (54.7 °F) during the day and 2.1 °C (35.8 °F) at night. In the warmest month, August, the average temperature is 31.7 °C (89.1 °F) during the day and 17.3 °C (63.1 °F) at night.

December, January and February are the coldest months, with a daily mean temperature of approximately 8 °C (46 °F). Temperatures during these months generally vary between 10 and 15 °C (50 and 59 °F) during the day and between 3 and 5 °C (37 and 41 °F) at night, with colder or warmer spells occurring frequently. Snowfall is rare but not unheard of, with light snow or flurries occurring on some winters, generally without accumulation, and major snowfalls on a very rare occurrence (the most recent ones were in 2018, 2012 and 1986).

The average relative humidity is 75%, varying from 72% in July to 77% in November. Sea temperatures vary from a low of 13.9 °C (57.0 °F) in February to a high of 25.0 °C (77.0 °F) in August.

The highest temperature ever recorded in Rome was 42.9 °C (109.2 °F) on 18 July 2023.

Climate data for Rome Urbe Airport (1991–2020 averages, extremes 1862–present)
Month	Jan	Feb	Mar	Apr	May	Jun	Jul	Aug	Sep	Oct	Nov	Dec	Year
Record high °C (°F)	20.2 (68.4)	23.6 (74.5)	27.0 (80.6)	30.1 (86.2)	34.5 (94.1)	40.1 (104.2)	42.9 (109.2)	40.7 (105.3)	38.4 (101.1)	32.4 (90.3)	26.8 (80.2)	22.8 (73.0)	42.9 (109.2)
Mean maximum °C (°F)	16.4 (61.5)	18.2 (64.8)	21.9 (71.4)	25.4 (77.7)	30.1 (86.2)	34.6 (94.3)	37.5 (99.5)	37.8 (100.0)	33.2 (91.8)	28.1 (82.6)	21.6 (70.9)	17.3 (63.1)	38.6 (101.5)
Mean daily maximum °C (°F)	12.6 (54.7)	13.8 (56.8)	16.8 (62.2)	20.0 (68.0)	24.8 (76.6)	29.5 (85.1)	32.6 (90.7)	32.7 (90.9)	27.9 (82.2)	22.8 (73.0)	17.1 (62.8)	13.2 (55.8)	22.0 (71.6)
Daily mean °C (°F)	7.9 (46.2)	8.6 (47.5)	11.2 (52.2)	14.2 (57.6)	18.7 (65.7)	23.1 (73.6)	26.0 (78.8)	26.1 (79.0)	21.9 (71.4)	17.4 (63.3)	12.4 (54.3)	8.7 (47.7)	16.4 (61.5)
Mean daily minimum °C (°F)	3.2 (37.8)	3.4 (38.1)	5.6 (42.1)	8.3 (46.9)	12.5 (54.5)	16.7 (62.1)	19.3 (66.7)	19.5 (67.1)	15.9 (60.6)	12.1 (53.8)	7.7 (45.9)	4.2 (39.6)	10.7 (51.3)
Mean minimum °C (°F)	−2.5 (27.5)	−2.1 (28.2)	−0.4 (31.3)	2.8 (37.0)	7.1 (44.8)	11.3 (52.3)	14.4 (57.9)	14.6 (58.3)	10.8 (51.4)	6.5 (43.7)	1.5 (34.7)	−1.6 (29.1)	−3.8 (25.2)
Record low °C (°F)	−9.8 (14.4)	−9.0 (15.8)	−6.0 (21.2)	−2.5 (27.5)	−0.4 (31.3)	6.0 (42.8)	9.8 (49.6)	8.6 (47.5)	5.4 (41.7)	−2.7 (27.1)	−7.2 (19.0)	−5.4 (22.3)	−9.8 (14.4)
Average precipitation mm (inches)	65.6 (2.58)	62.8 (2.47)	58.6 (2.31)	68.6 (2.70)	56.9 (2.24)	30.1 (1.19)	19.8 (0.78)	30.2 (1.19)	64.9 (2.56)	88.1 (3.47)	108.2 (4.26)	98.3 (3.87)	752.0 (29.61)
Average precipitation days (≥ 1 mm)	7.5	7.4	6.9	7.4	5.5	3.4	2.2	2.2	6.0	7.3	8.8	9.4	74.0
Average relative humidity (%)	75.8	71.5	70.6	70.4	69.0	65.4	63.3	64.1	69.1	74.0	77.9	77.2	70.7
Average dew point °C (°F)	3.9 (39.0)	3.5 (38.3)	5.8 (42.4)	8.5 (47.3)	12.1 (53.8)	15.1 (59.2)	16.9 (62.4)	17.7 (63.9)	15.5 (59.9)	12.9 (55.2)	9.3 (48.7)	5.2 (41.4)	10.5 (50.9)
Mean monthly sunshine hours	155.9	171.9	203.1	221.1	276.5	298.8	337.6	320.2	237.9	200.6	153.3	146.9	2,723.9
Percentage possible sunshine	53	58	55	56	61	65	73	75	63	58	51	51	60

Climate data for Rome Ciampino Airport, elevation: 129 m or 423 ft, 1991–2020 normals, extremes 1944–present
Month	Jan	Feb	Mar	Apr	May	Jun	Jul	Aug	Sep	Oct	Nov	Dec	Year
Record high °C (°F)	20.8 (69.4)	23.0 (73.4)	26.6 (79.9)	30.0 (86.0)	34.2 (93.6)	39.3 (102.7)	42.9 (109.2)	40.6 (105.1)	40.0 (104.0)	32.0 (89.6)	26.1 (79.0)	21.2 (70.2)	40.6 (105.1)
Mean daily maximum °C (°F)	12.0 (53.6)	13.0 (55.4)	15.8 (60.4)	18.8 (65.8)	22.3 (72.1)	28.1 (82.6)	31.0 (87.8)	31.6 (88.9)	26.7 (80.1)	22.2 (72.0)	16.9 (62.4)	12.7 (54.9)	21.0 (69.8)
Daily mean °C (°F)	7.5 (45.5)	8.0 (46.4)	10.7 (51.3)	13.6 (56.5)	18.0 (64.4)	22.5 (72.5)	25.1 (77.2)	25.4 (77.7)	21.0 (69.8)	17.0 (62.6)	12.4 (54.3)	8.5 (47.3)	15.8 (60.4)
Mean daily minimum °C (°F)	3.4 (38.1)	3.4 (38.1)	5.9 (42.6)	8.6 (47.5)	12.6 (54.7)	16.7 (62.1)	19.3 (66.7)	19.8 (67.6)	16.0 (60.8)	12.4 (54.3)	8.5 (47.3)	4.7 (40.5)	10.9 (51.6)
Record low °C (°F)	−11.0 (12.2)	−6.9 (19.6)	−6.5 (20.3)	−2.4 (27.7)	1.8 (35.2)	5.6 (42.1)	9.1 (48.4)	9.3 (48.7)	4.3 (39.7)	0.8 (33.4)	−5.2 (22.6)	−6.6 (20.1)	−11.0 (12.2)
Average precipitation mm (inches)	65.6 (2.58)	62.8 (2.47)	58.6 (2.31)	68.6 (2.70)	56.9 (2.24)	30.1 (1.19)	19.8 (0.78)	30.2 (1.19)	64.9 (2.56)	88.1 (3.47)	108.2 (4.26)	98.3 (3.87)	752.0 (29.61)
Average precipitation days (≥ 1.0 mm)	7.40	7.48	6.85	7.42	5.54	3.38	2.16	2.20	6.00	7.32	8.84	9.44	74.03
Average relative humidity (%)	75.8	71.5	70.6	70.4	69.0	65.4	63.3	64.1	69.1	74.0	77.9	77.2	70.7
Average dew point °C (°F)	3.9 (39.0)	3.5 (38.3)	5.8 (42.4)	8.5 (47.3)	12.1 (53.8)	15.1 (59.2)	16.9 (62.4)	17.7 (63.9)	15.5 (59.9)	12.9 (55.2)	9.3 (48.7)	5.2 (41.4)	10.5 (50.9)
Mean monthly sunshine hours	155.9	171.9	203.1	221.1	276.5	298.8	337.6	320.2	237.9	200.6	153.3	146.9	2,723.9
Percentage possible sunshine	53	58	55	56	61	65	73	75	63	58	51	51	60
Source 1: NOAA
Source 2: Temperature extreme in Toscana

== Demographics ==
Rome (comune) age-sex pyramid in 2022

Historical population
Year	Pop.	±%
1871	212,386	—
1881	273,893	+29.0%
1901	422,319	+54.2%
1911	518,804	+22.8%
1921	660,091	+27.2%
1931	930,723	+41.0%
1936	1,150,338	+23.6%
1951	1,632,402	+41.9%
1961	2,163,555	+32.5%
1971	2,750,370	+27.1%
1981	2,805,109	+2.0%
1991	2,733,908	−2.5%
2001	2,546,804	−6.8%
2011	2,617,175	+2.8%
2021	2,749,031	+5.0%
Source: ISTAT

By 550 BC, Rome was the second largest city in Italy after only Taras (modern Taranto) on the Salento Peninsula. It had an area of about 285 ha (700 acres) and an estimated population of 35,000. Other sources suggest the population was just under 100,000 from 600 to 500 BC. When the Republic was founded in 509 BC the census recorded a population of 130,000. The republic included the city itself and the immediate surroundings. Other sources suggest a population of 150,000 in 500 BC. It surpassed 300,000 by 150 BC.

The size of the city at the time of the Emperor Augustus is a matter of speculation, with estimates based on grain distribution, grain imports, aqueduct capacity, city limits, population density, census reports, and assumptions about the number of unreported women, children and slaves providing a very wide range. Glenn Storey estimates 450,000 people, Whitney Oates estimates 1.2 million, Neville Morely provides a rough estimate of 800,000 and excludes earlier suggestions of 2 million. Estimates of the city's population towards and after the end of the Roman empire also vary. A.H.M. Jones estimated the population at 650,000 in the mid-fifth century. The damage caused by the sackings may have been overestimated. The population had already started to decline from the late fourth century onward, although around the middle of the fifth century it seems that Rome continued to be the most populous city of the two parts of the Empire. According to Krautheimer it was still close to 800,000 in 400 AD; had declined to 500,000 by 452, and dwindled to perhaps 100,000 in 500 AD. After the Gothic Wars, 535–552, the population may have dwindled temporarily to 30,000. During the pontificate of Pope Gregory I (590–604), it may have reached 90,000, augmented by refugees. Lancon estimates 500,000 based on the number of 'incisi' enrolled as eligible to receive bread, oil and wine rations; the number fell to 120,000 in the reform of 419. Neil Christie, citing free rations for the poorest, estimated 500,000 in the mid-fifth century and still a quarter of a million at the end of the century. Novel 36 of Emperor Valentinian III records 3.629 million pounds of pork to be distributed to the needy at 5 lbs. per month for the five winter months, sufficient for 145,000 recipients. This has been used to suggest a population of just under 500,000. Supplies of grain remained steady until the seizure of the remaining provinces of North Africa in 439 by the Vandals, and may have continued to some degree afterwards for a while. The city's population declined to less than 50,000 people in the Early Middle Ages from 700 onward. It continued to stagnate or shrink until the Renaissance.

When the Kingdom of Italy annexed Rome in 1870, the city had a population of about 225,000. Less than half the city within the walls was built up in 1881 when the population recorded was 275,000. This increased to 600,000 by the eve of World War I. The Fascist regime of Mussolini tried to block an excessive demographic rise of the city but failed to prevent it from reaching one million people by the early 1930s. Population growth continued after the Second World War, helped by a post-war economic boom. A construction boom also created many suburbs during the 1950s and 1960s.

As of 2026, the population is 2,745,062, of which 47.6% are males, and 52.4% are females. Minors make up 14.4% of the population, and seniors make up 24.4%.

The urban area of Rome extends beyond the administrative city limits with a population of around 3.9 million. Between 3.2 and 4.2 million people live in the Rome metropolitan area.

=== Foreigners ===
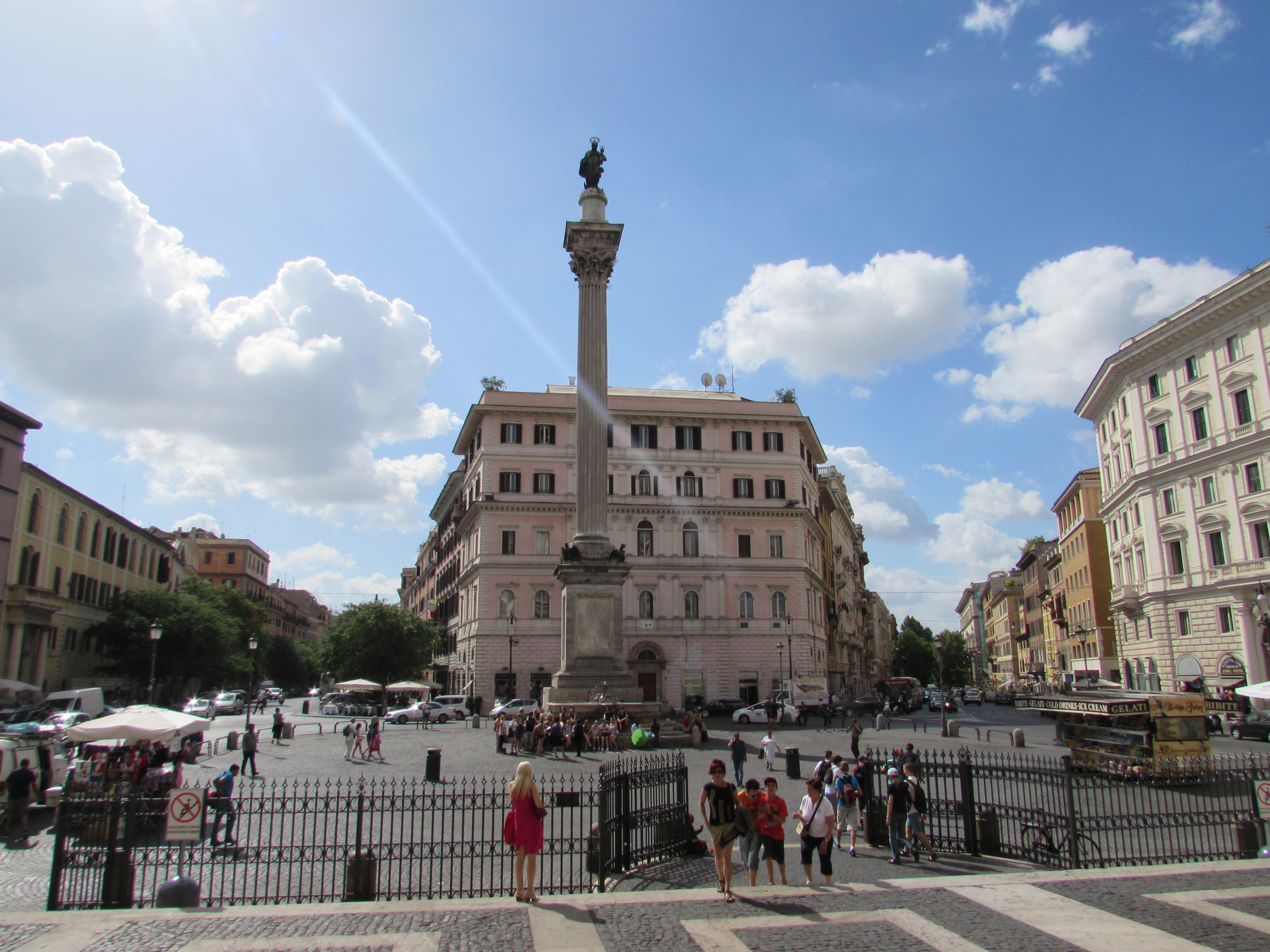
Piazza Santa Maria Maggiore, in the Esquilino rione

As of 2025, immigrants make up 14.7% of the population. The 5 largest foreign countries of birth are Romania, Philippines, Bangladesh, Ukraine, and Peru.

Foreign-born population (2025)
Country of birth	Population
Romania	59,401
Philippines	33,498
Bangladesh	33,488
Ukraine	16,741
Peru	16,204
Egypt	14,509
China	13,911
India	11,759
Poland	9,713
Moldova	9,466
Albania	9,251
Sri Lanka	8,251
Brazil	7,784
France	6,482
Ecuador	6,242

According to the 2011 statistics conducted by ISTAT, approximately 9.5% of the population consists of non-Italians. About half of the immigrant population consists of those of various other European origins (chiefly Romanian, Polish, Ukrainian, and Albanian) numbering a combined total of 131,118 or 4.7% of the population. The remaining 4.8% are those with non-European origins, chiefly Filipinos (26,933), Bangladeshis (12,154), and Chinese (10,283).

The Esquilino rione, off Termini Railway Station, has evolved into a largely immigrant neighbourhood. It is perceived as Rome's Chinatown. Historically, a substantial proportation of Rome's Chinese community has originated from Qingtian, Wencheng, Rui'an, and other counties of Wenzhou in southern Zhejiang. Immigrants from more than a hundred different countries reside there. A commercial district, Esquilino contains restaurants featuring many kinds of international cuisine. There are wholesale clothes shops. Of the 1,300 or so commercial premises operating in the district 800 are Chinese-owned; around 300 are run by immigrants from other countries around the world; 200 are owned by Italians.

Country of citizenship, 1 January 2023	Population
All countries of the world	511,332
European Union (28 countries)	193,427
Other European non-EU-28 countries	61,566
Northern Africa	31,237
Western Africa	20,489
Eastern Africa	8,568
Central and South Africa	2,845
Western Asia	9,073
Eastern Asia	65,431
Central and South Asia	74,060
Northern America	2,903
Central and South America	41,279
Oceania	303
Stateless	151

=== Language ===
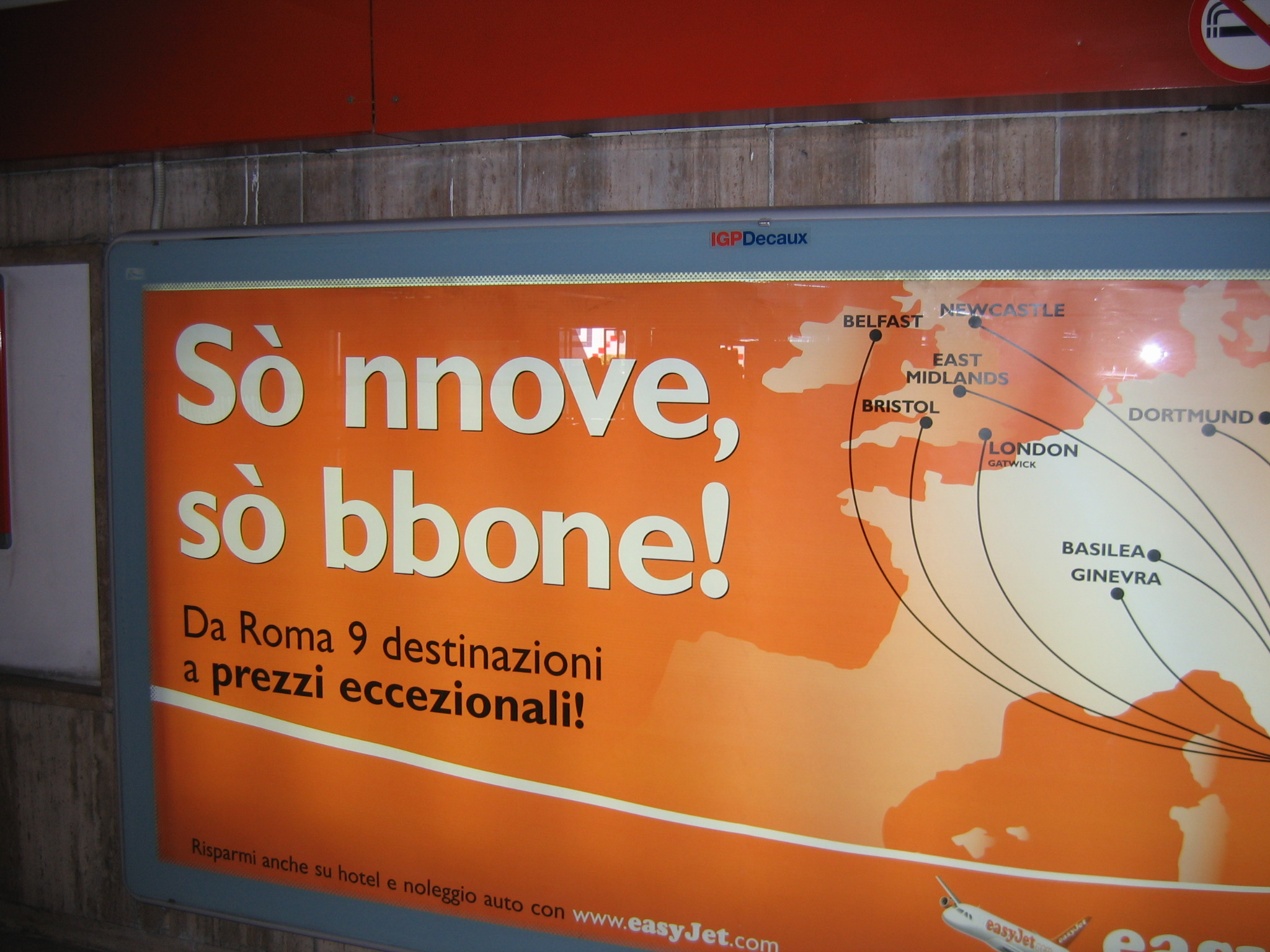
Advertisement in Romanesco dialect at a subway station in Rome

Rome's historic contribution to language in a worldwide sense is extensive. Through the process of Romanization, the peoples of Italy, Gallia, the Iberian Peninsula and Dacia developed languages which derive directly from Latin and were adopted in large areas of the world, all through cultural influence, colonisation and migration. Moreover, also modern English, because of the Norman Conquest, borrowed a large percentage of its vocabulary from the Latin language. The Roman or Latin alphabet is the most widely used writing system in the world used by the greatest number of languages.

The medieval Roman dialect belonged to the southern family of Italian dialects, and was thus much closer to the Neapolitan language than to the Florentine. A typical example of Romanesco of that period is Vita di Cola di Rienzo ("Life of Cola di Rienzo"), written by an anonymous Roman during the 14th century. Starting with the 16th century, the Roman dialect underwent a stronger and stronger influence from the Tuscan dialect (from which modern Italian derives) starting with the reigns of the two Medici popes (Leo X and Clement VII) and with the Sack of Rome in 1527, two events which provoked a large immigration from Tuscany.

=== Religion ===
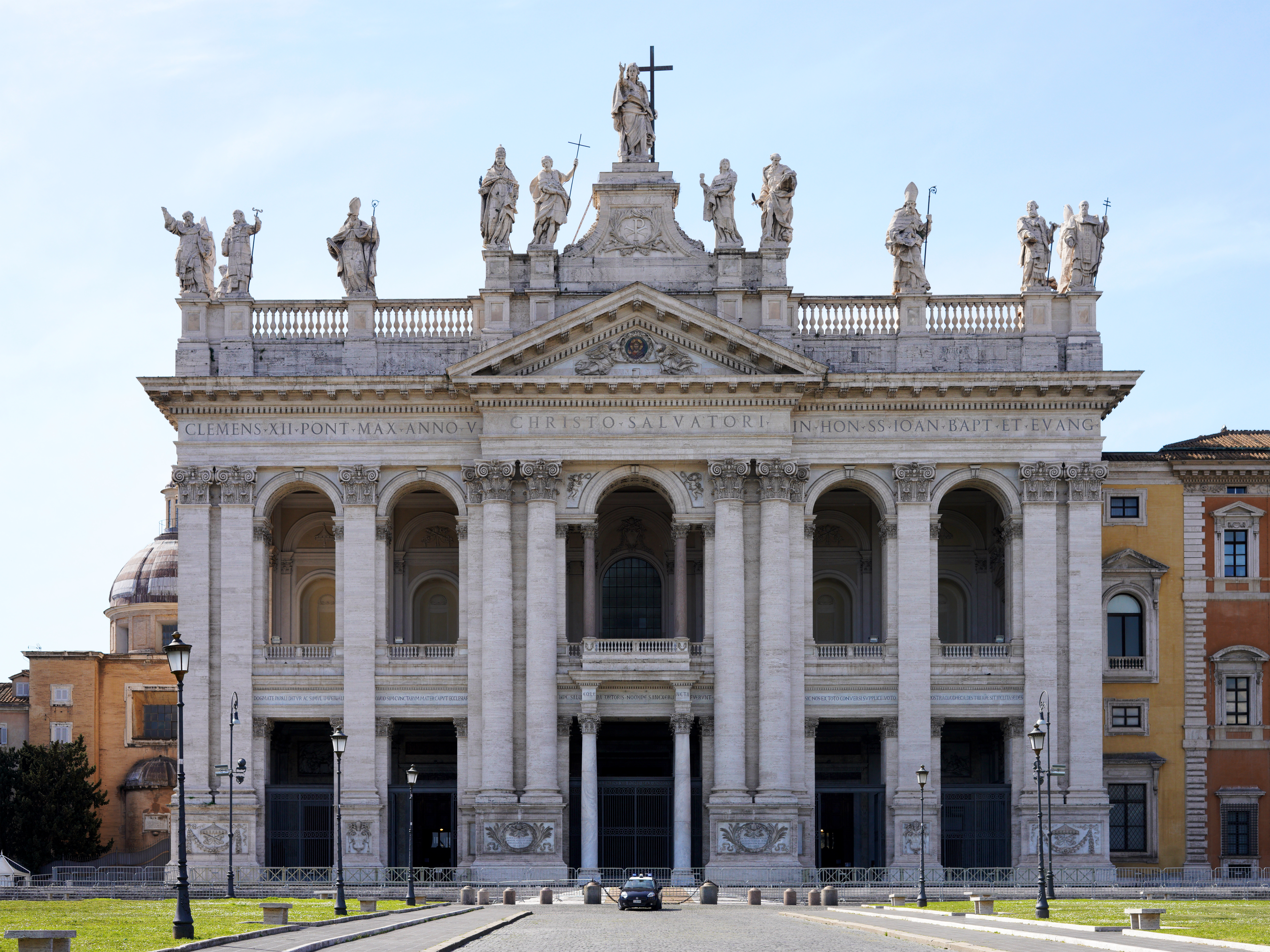
Archbasilica of Saint John Lateran, Rome's Cathedral, built in 324, and partly rebuilt between 1660 and 1734

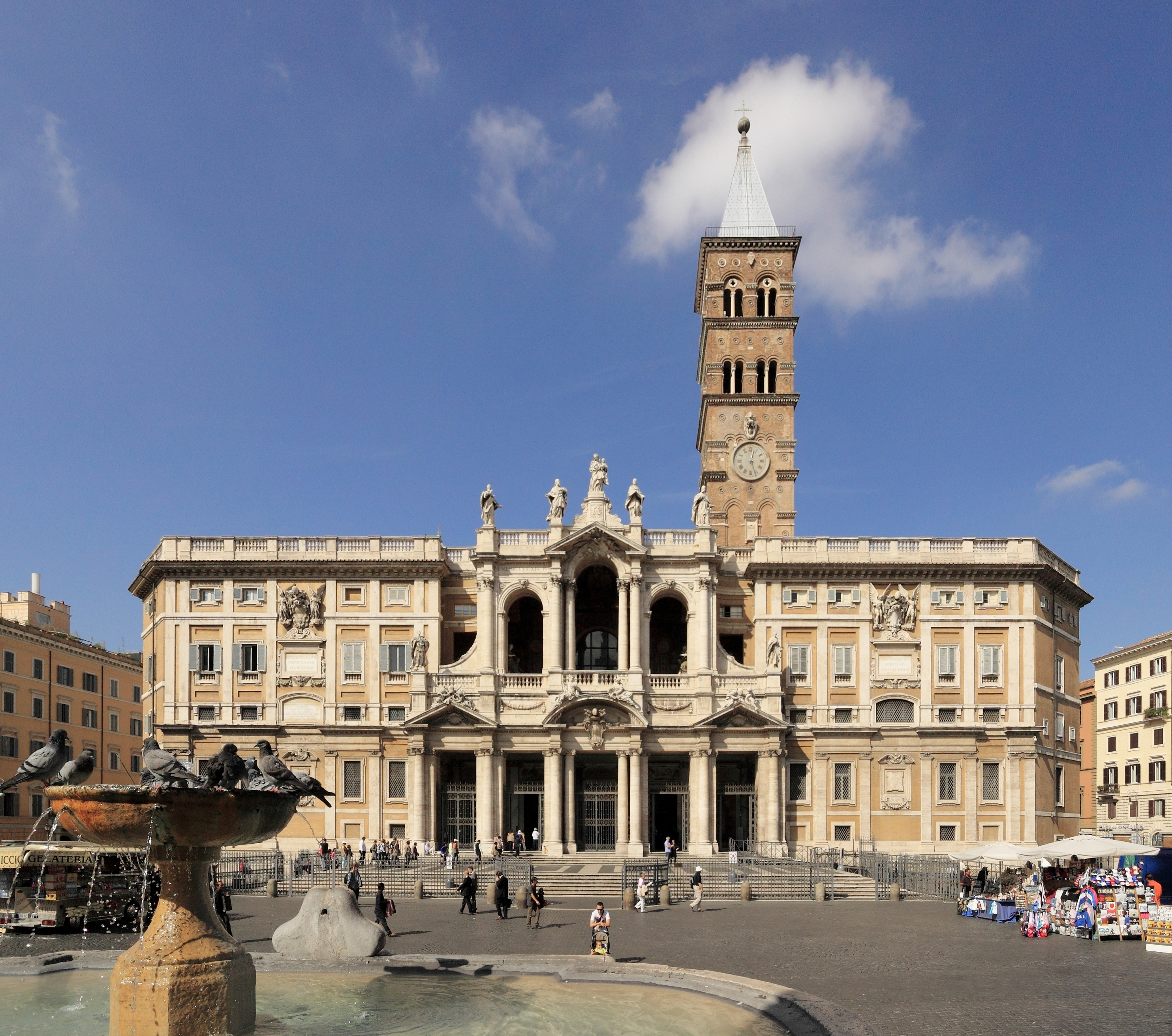
One of the Seven Pilgrim Churches of Rome, Santa Maria Maggiore is the city's largest Catholic Marian church.

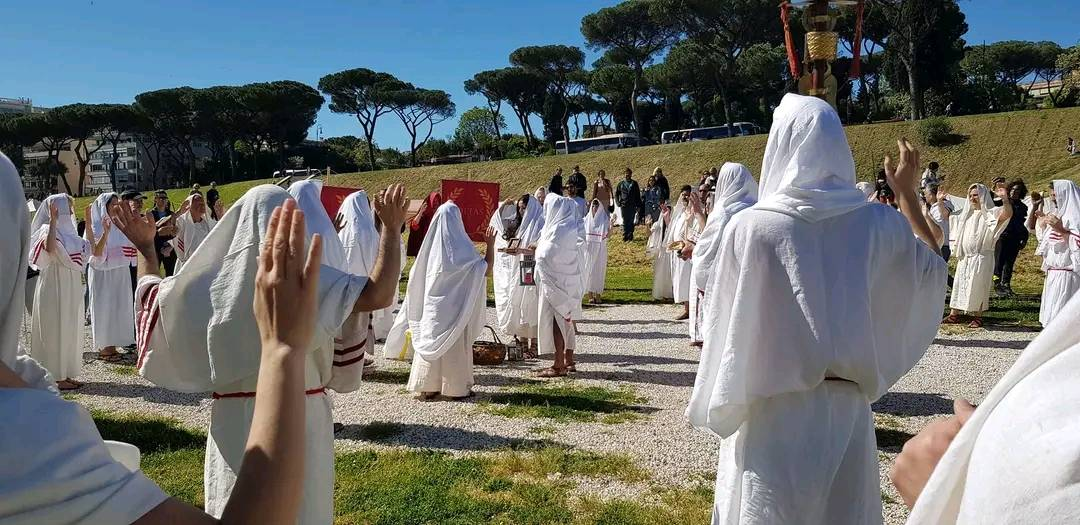
Celebration of the 2777th Natale di Roma at the Circus Maximus

Much like the rest of Italy, Rome is predominantly Christian, and the city has been an important centre of religion and pilgrimage for centuries, the base of the ancient Roman religion with the pontifex maximus and later the seat of the Vatican and the pope. Before the arrival of the Christians in Rome, the Religio Romana (literally, the "Roman Religion") was the major religion of the city in classical antiquity. The first gods held sacred by the Romans were Jupiter, the Most High, and Mars, the god of war, and father of Rome's twin founders, Romulus and Remus, according to tradition. Other deities such as Vesta and Minerva were honoured. Rome was also the base of several mystery cults, such as Mithraism. Later, after St Peter and St Paul were martyred in the city, and the first Christians began to arrive, Rome became Christian, and the Old St. Peter's Basilica was constructed in 313 AD. Despite some interruptions (such as the Avignon papacy), Rome has for centuries been the home of the Roman Catholic Church and the Bishop of Rome, otherwise known as the Pope.

Despite the fact that Rome is home to the Vatican City and St. Peter's Basilica, Rome's cathedral is the Archbasilica of Saint John Lateran, in the south-east of the city centre. There are around 900 churches in Rome in total. Aside from the cathedral itself, some others of note include the Basilica di Santa Maria Maggiore, the Basilica of Saint Paul Outside the Walls, the Basilica di San Clemente, San Carlo alle Quattro Fontane and the Church of the Gesù. There are also the ancient Catacombs of Rome underneath the city. Numerous highly important religious educational institutions are also in Rome, such as the Pontifical Lateran University, Pontifical Biblical Institute, Pontifical Gregorian University, and Pontifical Oriental Institute.

The territory of Vatican City is part of the Mons Vaticanus (Vatican Hill), and of the adjacent former Vatican Fields, where St. Peter's Basilica, the Apostolic Palace, the Sistine Chapel, and museums were built, along with various other buildings. The area was part of the Roman rione of Borgo until 1929. Being separated from the city on the west bank of the Tiber, the area was a suburb that was protected by being included within the walls of Leo IV, later expanded by the current fortification walls of Paul III, Pius IV, and Urban VIII. When the Lateran Treaty of 1929 that created the Vatican state was being prepared, the boundaries of the proposed territory were influenced by the fact that much of it was all but enclosed by this loop.

Rome has been a major Christian pilgrimage site since the Middle Ages. People from all over the Christian world visit Vatican City, within the city of Rome, the seat of the papacy. The city became a major pilgrimage site during the Middle Ages. Apart from brief periods as an independent city during the Middle Ages, Rome kept its status as Papal capital and holy city for centuries, even when the Papacy briefly relocated to Avignon (1309–1377). Catholics believe that the Vatican is the last resting place of St. Peter. Pilgrimages to Rome can involve visits to many sites, both within Vatican City and in Italian territory. A popular stopping point is the Pilate's stairs: these are, according to the Christian tradition, the steps that led up to the praetorium of Pontius Pilate in Jerusalem, which Jesus Christ stood on during his Passion on his way to trial.

In addition, since the end of the Roman Republic, Rome has hosted a Jewish community, which was once based in Trastevere, and later confined to living in a ghetto that was eventually abolished in 1870. In the area of the former ghetto lies the synagogue, the Tempio Maggiore.

Rome also hosts multiple Buddhist temples, and a variety of Roman modern pagan temples held by the Associazione Tradizionale Pietas which every year takes part in the religious festivities of the Natale di Roma, historically known as Dies Romana and also referred to as Romaia, the festival linked to the foundation of Rome, celebrated on 21 April. According to legend, Romulus is said to have founded the city of Rome on 21 April, 753 BC. From this date, the Roman chronology derived its system, known by the Latin phrase Ab Urbe condita, meaning "from the founding of the City", which counted the years from this presumed foundation.

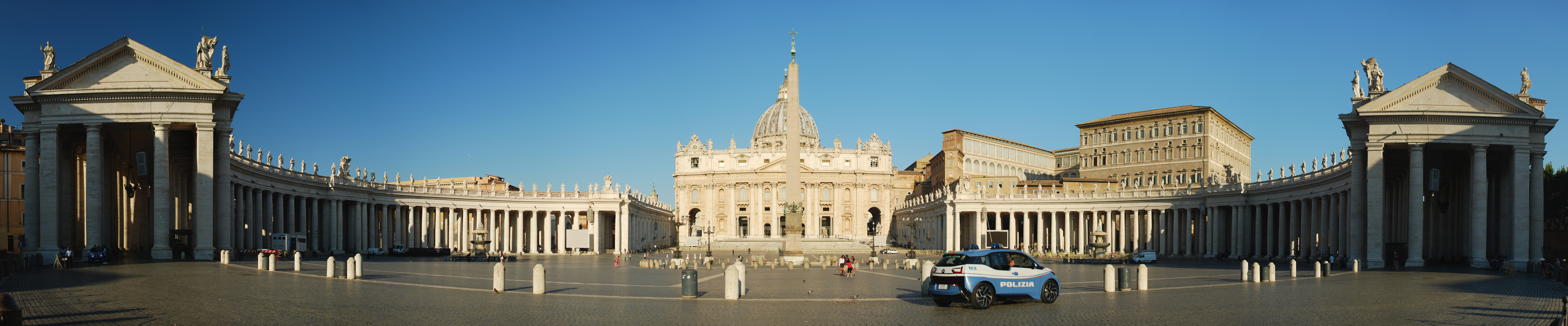
St. Peter's Square in Vatican City

== Government ==
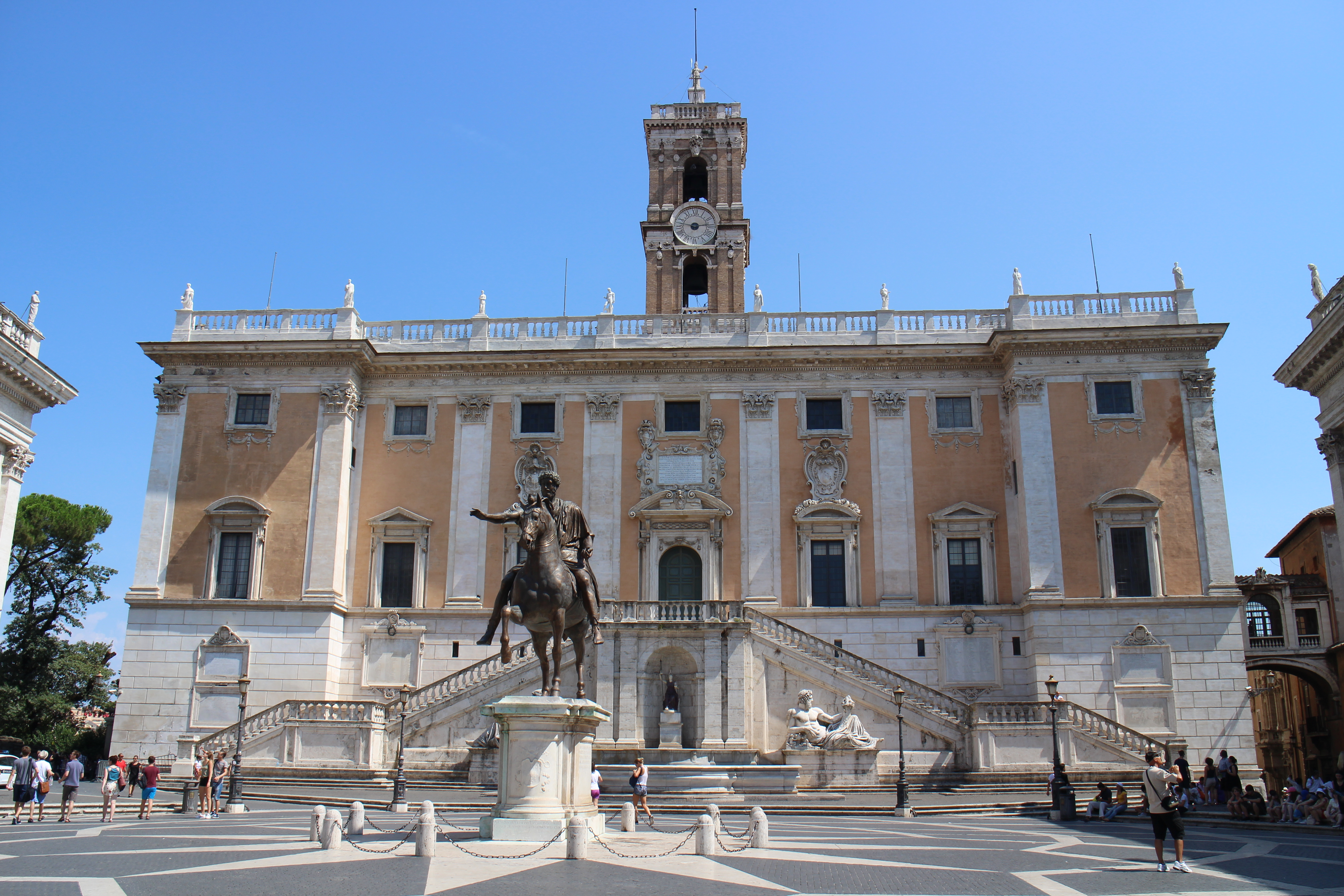
Palazzo Senatorio, seat of the municipality of Rome. It has been a town hall since 1144, making it the oldest town hall in the world.

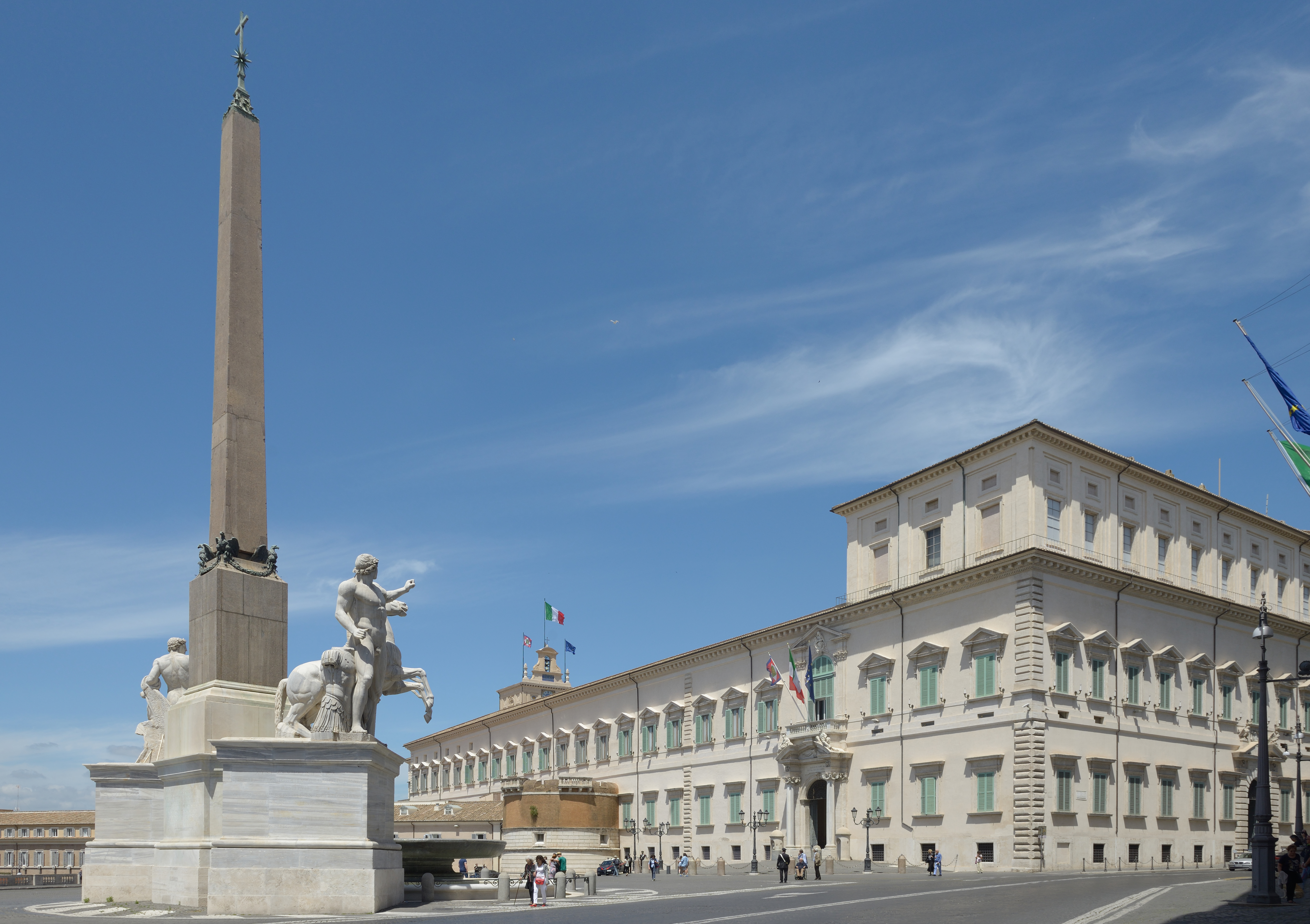
Palazzo del Quirinale, current seat of the President of the Italian Republic

Rome constitutes a comune speciale, named "Roma Capitale", and is the largest both in terms of land area and population among the 8,101 comuni of Italy. It is governed by a mayor and a city council. The seat of the comune is the Palazzo Senatorio on the Capitoline Hill, the historic seat of the city government. The local administration in Rome is commonly referred to as "Campidoglio", the Italian name of the hill. Palazzo Senatorio, seat of the municipality of Rome, has been a town hall since AD 1144, making it the oldest town hall in the world.

Since 1972, the city has been divided into administrative areas, called municipi (sing. municipio) (until 2001 named circoscrizioni). They were created for administrative reasons to increase decentralisation in the city. Each municipio is governed by a president and a council of twenty-five members who are elected by its residents every five years. The municipi frequently cross the boundaries of the traditional, non-administrative divisions of the city. The municipi were originally 20, then 19, and in 2013, their number was reduced to 15.

Rome is also divided into differing types of non-administrative units. The historic centre is divided into 22 rioni, all of which are located within the Aurelian Walls except Prati and Borgo. These originate from the 14 regions of Augustan Rome, which evolved in the Middle Ages into the medieval rioni. In the Renaissance, under Pope Sixtus V, they again reached fourteen, and their boundaries were finally defined under Pope Benedict XIV in 1743.

Rome is the principal town of the Metropolitan City of Rome, operative since 1 January 2015. The Metropolitan City replaced the old provincia di Roma, which included the city's metropolitan area and extends further north until Civitavecchia. The Metropolitan City of Rome is the largest by area in Italy. At 5,352 km^{2} (2,066 sq mi), its dimensions are comparable to the region of Liguria. Moreover, the city is also the capital of the Lazio region.

Rome is the national capital of Italy and is the seat of the Italian Government. The official residences of the President of the Italian Republic and the Italian Prime Minister, the seats of both houses of the Italian Parliament and that of the Italian Constitutional Court are located in the historic centre. The state ministries are spread out around the city; these include the Ministry of Foreign Affairs, which is located in Palazzo della Farnesina near the Olympic stadium.

=== International relations ===
Food and Agriculture Organization headquarters in Rome, Circo Massimo

Among the global cities, Rome is unique in having two sovereign entities located entirely within its city limits, the Holy See, represented by the Vatican City State, and the territorially smaller Sovereign Military Order of Malta. The Vatican is an enclave of the Italian capital city and a sovereign possession of the Holy See, which is the Diocese of Rome and the supreme government of the Roman Catholic Church. For this reason, Rome has sometimes been described as the capital of two states. Rome is the seat of the so-called "Polo Romano" made up by three main international agencies of the United Nations: the Food and Agriculture Organization, the World Food Programme and the International Fund for Agricultural Development.

Rome has traditionally been involved in the process of European political integration. The Treaties of the EU are located in Palazzo della Farnesina. In 1957 the city hosted the signing of the Treaty of Rome, which established the European Economic Community (predecessor to the European Union), and also played host to the official signing of the proposed European Constitution in July 2004. Rome is the seat of the European Olympic Committee and of the NATO Defense College. The city is the place where the Statute of the International Criminal Court and the European Convention on Human Rights were formulated. The city hosts also other important international entities such as the International Development Law Organization, the International Centre for the Study of the Preservation and Restoration of Cultural Property and the UNIDROIT (International Institute for the Unification of Private Law).

==== Twin towns and sister cities ====
Since April 1956, Rome is exclusively and reciprocally twinned with Paris, France

Solo Parigi è degna di Roma; solo Roma è degna di Parigi. (in Italian)
Seule Paris est digne de Rome; seule Rome est digne de Paris. (in French)
"Only Paris is worthy of Rome; only Rome is worthy of Paris."

Rome's other partner cities are:

- Achacachi, Bolivia
- Algiers, Algeria
- Beijing, China
- Belgrade, Serbia
- Brasília, Brazil
- Buenos Aires, Argentina
- Cairo, Egypt
- Cincinnati, United States
- Kyiv, Ukraine
- Kobanî, Syria
- Kraków, Poland
- Madrid, Spain
- Multan, Pakistan
- New Delhi, India
- New York City, United States
- Plovdiv, Bulgaria
- Seoul, South Korea
- Sydney, Australia
- Tirana, Albania
- Tehran, Iran
- Tokyo, Japan
- Tongeren, Belgium
- Tunis, Tunisia
- Washington, D.C., United States
- Yerevan, Armenia

== Culture ==
=== Architecture ===
The architecture of Rome over the centuries has greatly developed from Ancient Roman architecture to Italian modern and contemporary architecture. Rome was once the world's main epicentres of Classical architecture, developing new forms such as the arch, the dome and the vault. The Romanesque style in the 11th, 12th and 13th centuries was also widely used in Roman architecture, and later the city became one of the main centres of Renaissance and Baroque architecture. Rome's cityscape is also widely Neoclassical and Fascist in style.

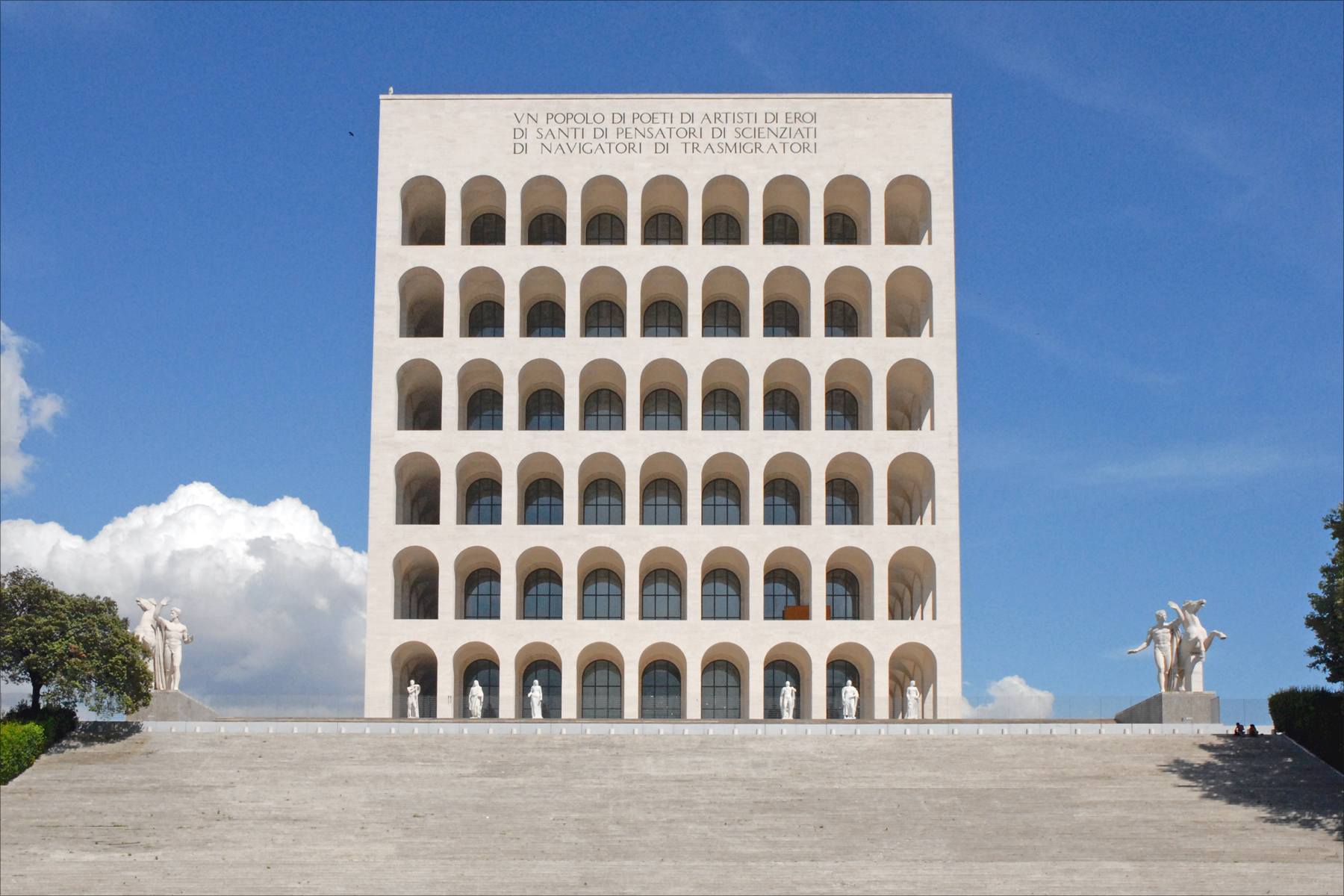
The Palazzo della Civiltà Italiana in EUR district

==== Fountains and aqueducts ====
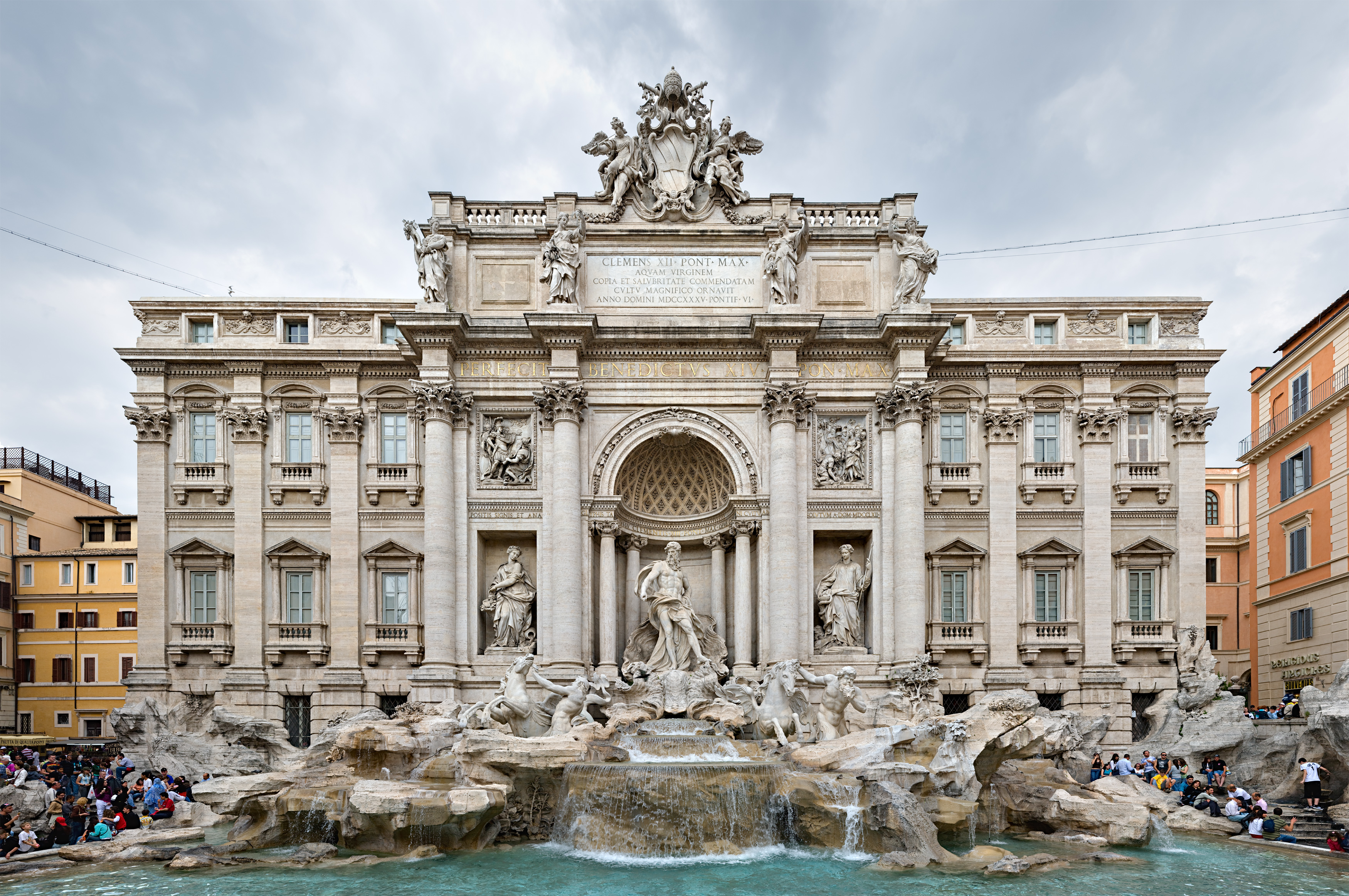
Construction of the Trevi Fountain began during the time of Ancient Rome and was completed in 1762 by a design of Nicola Salvi.

Rome is a city known for its numerous fountains, built-in all different styles, from Classical and Medieval, to Baroque and Neoclassical. The city has had fountains for more than two thousand years, and they have provided drinking water and decorated the piazzas of Rome. During the Roman Empire, in 98 AD, according to Sextus Julius Frontinus, the Roman consul who was named curator aquarum or guardian of the water of the city, Rome had nine aqueducts which fed 39 monumental fountains and 591 public basins, not counting the water supplied to the Imperial household, baths, and owners of private villas. Each of the major fountains was connected to two different aqueducts, in case one was shut down for service.

During the 17th and 18th century, the Roman popes reconstructed other degraded Roman aqueducts and built new display fountains to mark their termini, launching the golden age of the Roman fountain. The fountains of Rome, like the paintings of Rubens, were expressions of the new style of Baroque art. In these fountains, sculpture became the principal element, and the water was used simply to animate and decorate the sculptures. They, like baroque gardens, were "a visual representation of confidence and power".

==== Statues ====
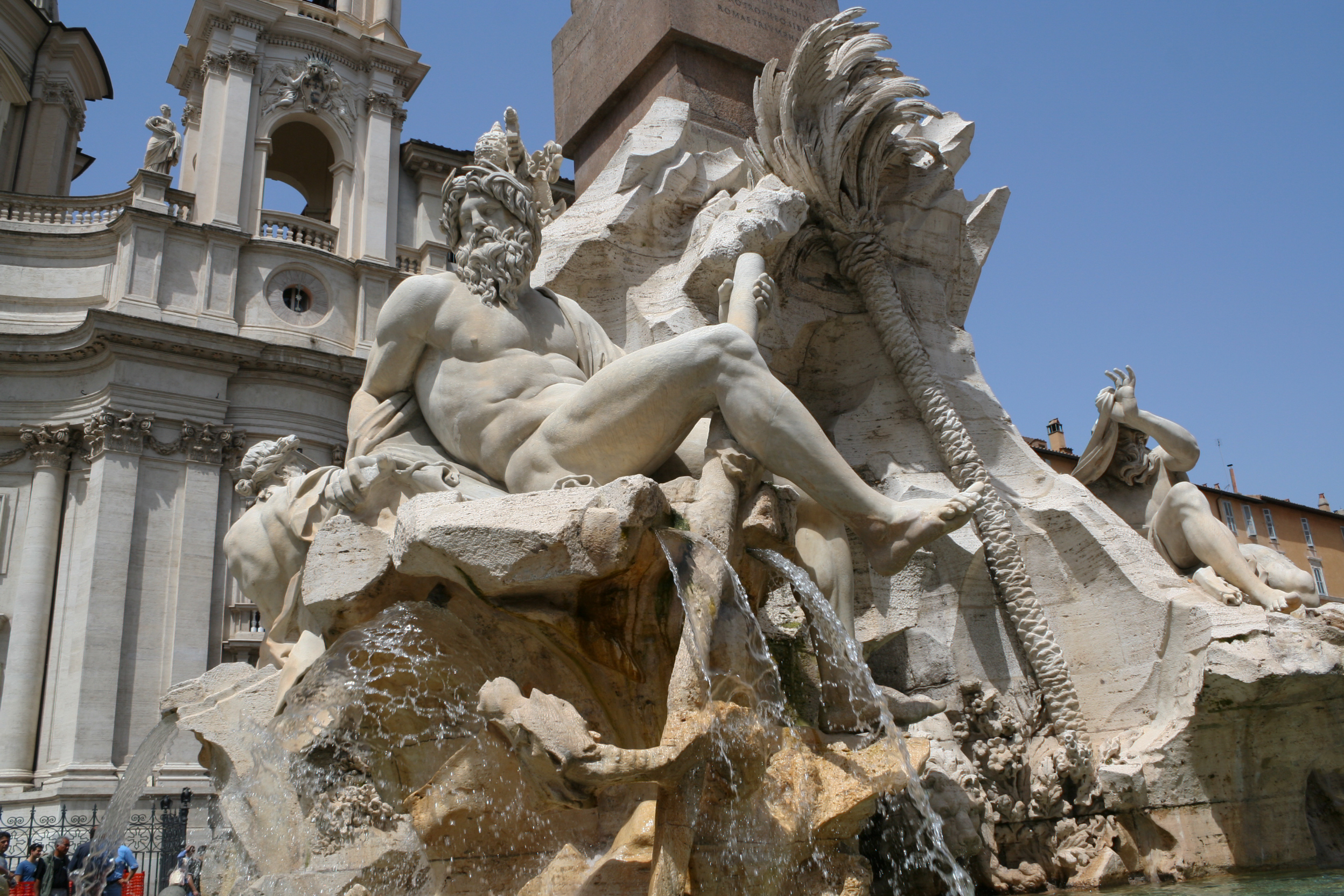
Fontana dei Fiumi by Gian Lorenzo Bernini, 1648

Rome is well known for its statues but, in particular, the talking statues of Rome. These are usually ancient statues which have become popular soapboxes for political and social discussion, and places for people to (often satirically) voice their opinions. There are two main talking statues: the Pasquino and the Marforio, yet there are four other noted ones: il Babuino, Madama Lucrezia, il Facchino and Abbot Luigi. Most of these statues are ancient Roman or classical, and most of them also depict mythical gods, ancient people or legendary figures; il Pasquino represents Menelaus, Abbot Luigi is an unknown Roman magistrate, il Babuino is supposed to be Silenus, Marforio represents Oceanus, Madama Lucrezia is a bust of Isis, and il Facchino is the only non-Roman statue, created in 1580, and not representing anyone in particular. They are often, due to their status, covered with placards or graffiti expressing political ideas and points of view. Other statues in the city, which are not related to the talking statues, include those of the Ponte Sant'Angelo, or several monuments scattered across the city, such as that to Giordano Bruno in the Campo de'Fiori.

==== Obelisks and columns ====
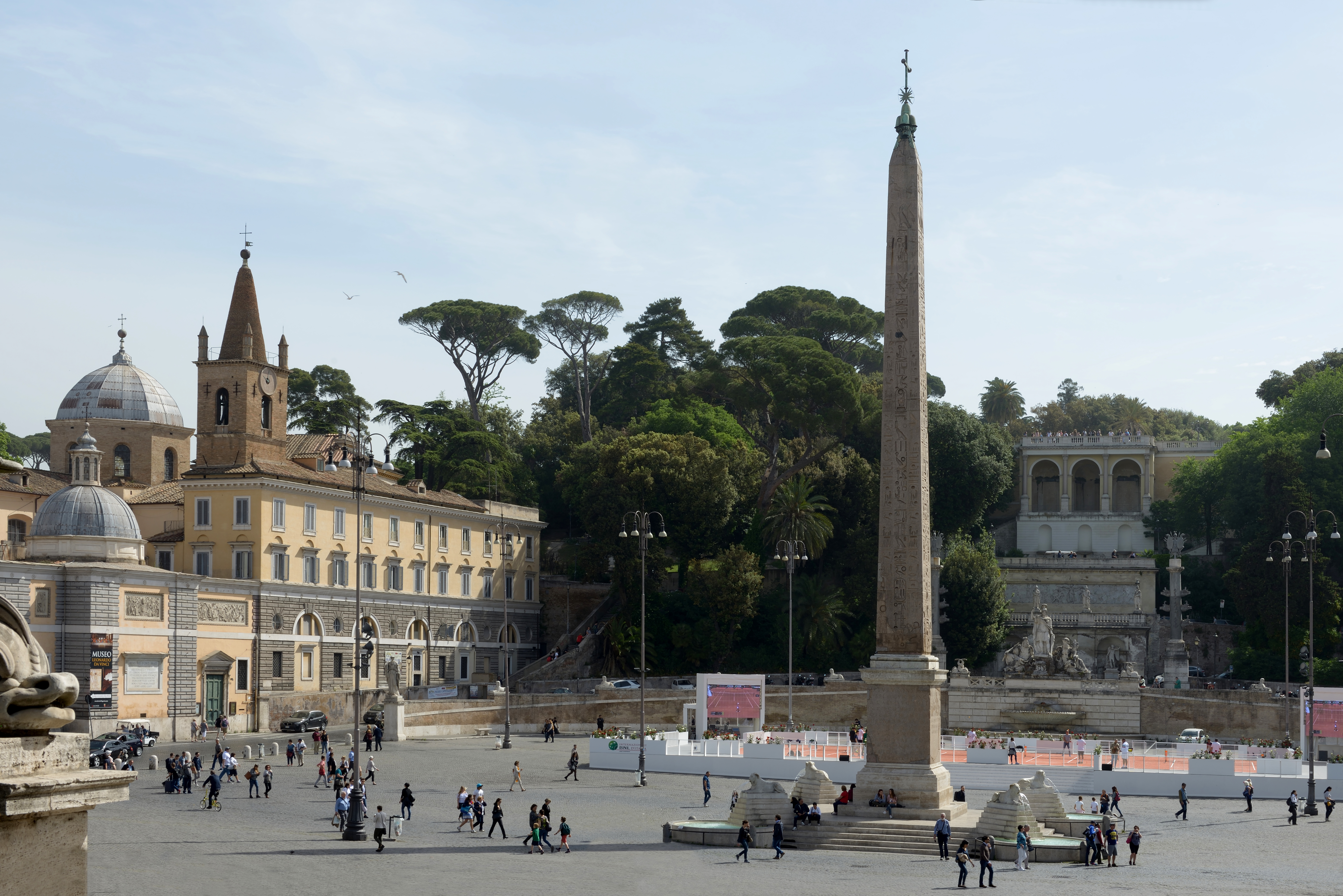
Flaminio Obelisk, Piazza del Popolo

The city hosts eight ancient Egyptian and five ancient Roman obelisks, together with a number of more modern obelisks; there was also formerly (until 2005) an ancient Ethiopian obelisk in Rome. The city contains some of obelisks in piazzas, such as in Piazza Navona, St Peter's Square, Piazza Montecitorio, and Piazza del Popolo, and others in villas, thermae parks and gardens, such as in Villa Celimontana, the Baths of Diocletian, and the Pincian Hill. Moreover, the centre of Rome hosts also Trajan's and Antonine Column, two ancient Roman columns with spiral relief. The Column of Marcus Aurelius is located in Piazza Colonna and it was built around AD 180 by Commodus in memory of his parents. The Column of Marcus Aurelius was inspired by Trajan's Column at Trajan's Forum, which is part of the Imperial Fora.

==== Bridges ====
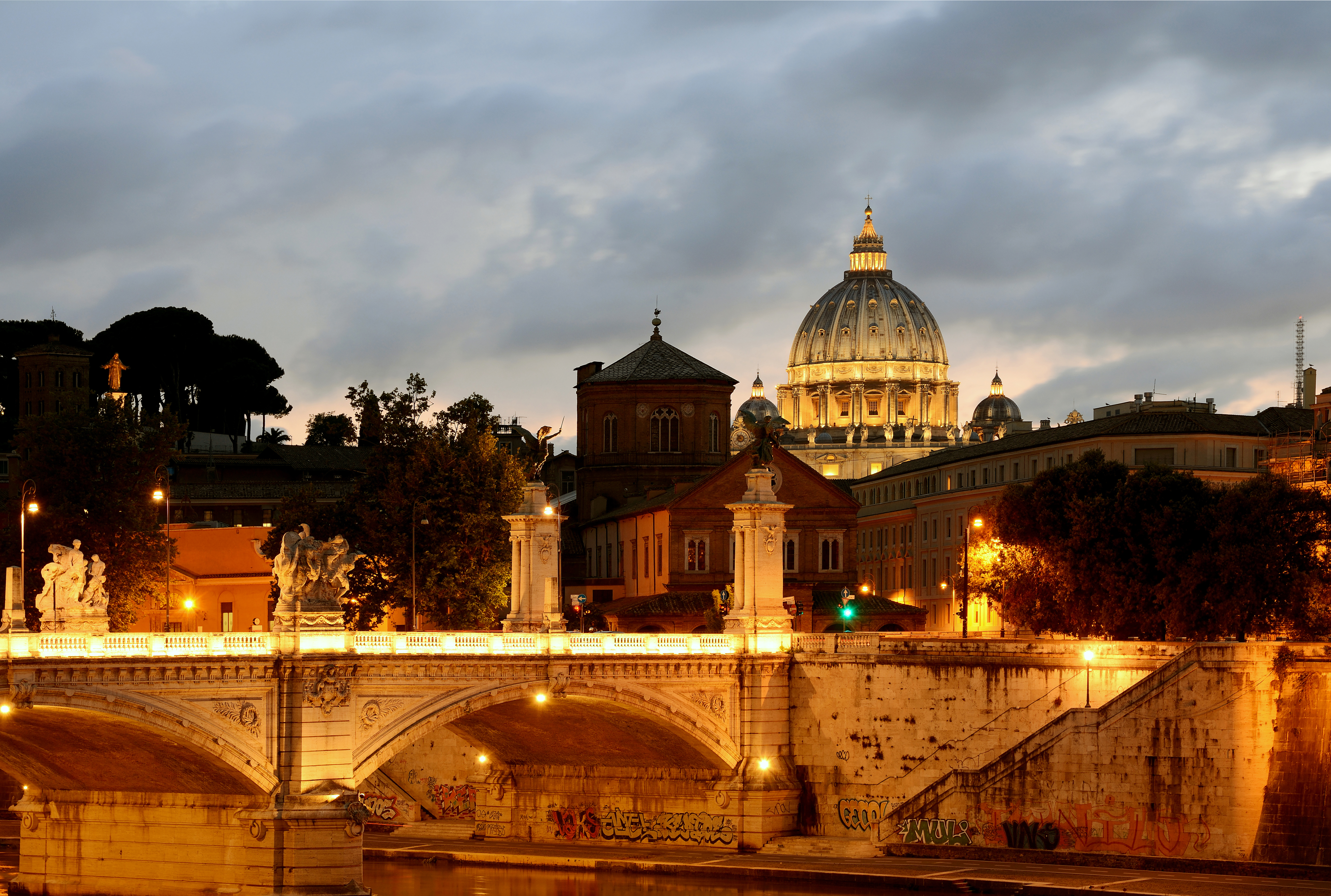
Ponte Vittorio Emanuele II at sunset

The city of Rome contains numerous famous bridges which cross the Tiber. The only bridge to remain unaltered until today from the classical age is Ponte dei Quattro Capi, which connects the Isola Tiberina with the left bank. The other surviving – albeit modified – ancient Roman bridges crossing the Tiber are Ponte Cestio, Ponte Sant'Angelo and Ponte Milvio. Considering Ponte Nomentano, also built during ancient Rome, which crosses the Aniene, currently there are five ancient Roman bridges still remaining in the city. Other noteworthy bridges are Ponte Sisto, the first bridge built in the Renaissance above Roman foundations; Ponte Rotto, actually the only remaining arch of the ancient Pons Aemilius, collapsed during the flood of 1598 and demolished at the end of the 19th century; and Ponte Vittorio Emanuele II, a modern bridge connecting Corso Vittorio Emanuele and Borgo. Most of the city's public bridges were built in Classical or Renaissance style, but also in Baroque, Neoclassical and Modern styles. According to the Encyclopædia Britannica, the finest ancient bridge remaining in Rome is the Ponte Sant'Angelo, which was completed in 135 AD, and was decorated with ten statues of the angels, designed by Bernini in 1688.

==== Catacombs ====
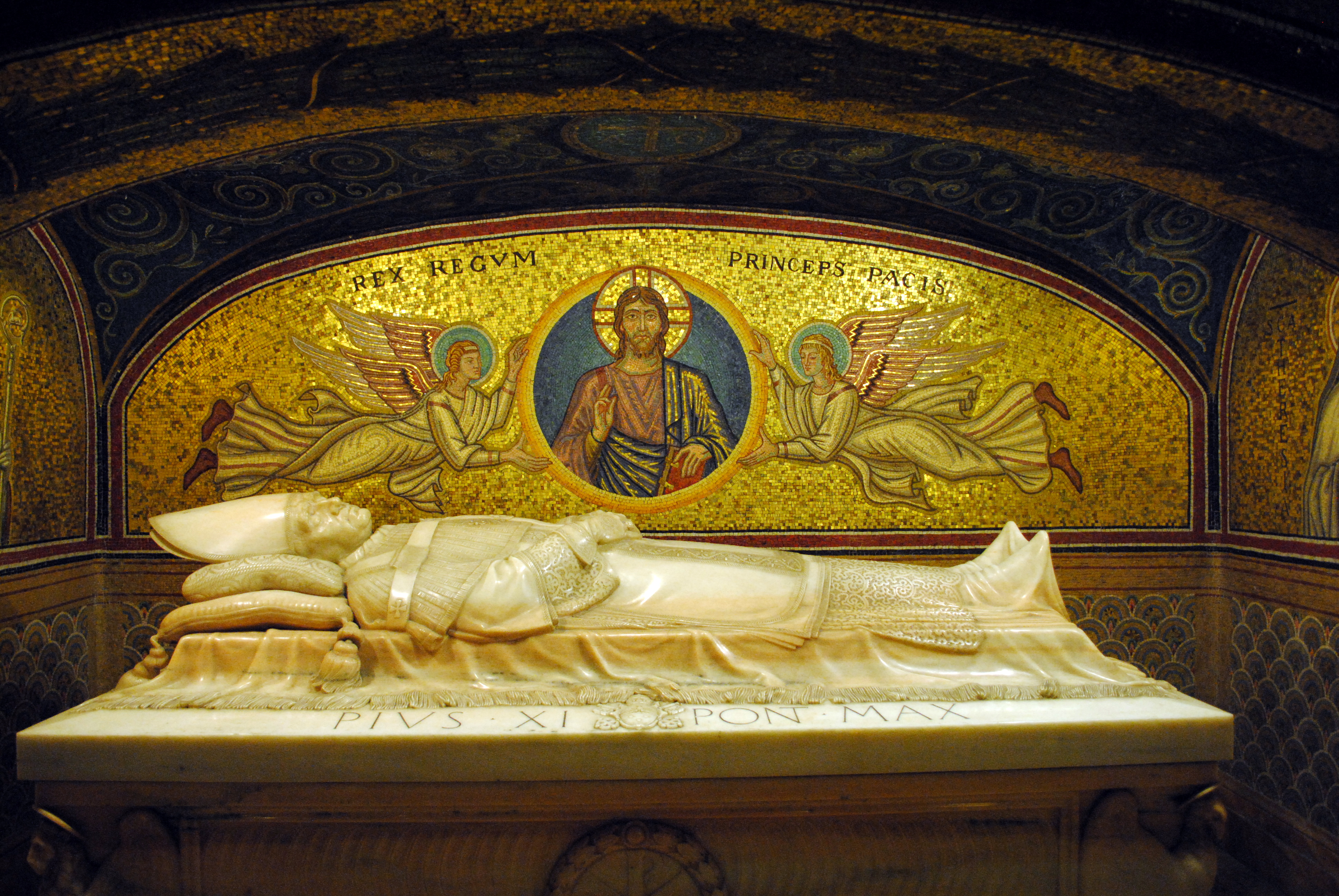
The Vatican Caves are the location of many papal burials.

Rome has an extensive amount of ancient catacombs, or underground burial places under or near the city, of which there are at least forty, some discovered only in recent decades. Though most famous for Christian burials, they include pagan and Jewish burials, either in separate catacombs or mixed together. The first large-scale catacombs were excavated from the 2nd century onwards. Originally they were carved through tuff, a soft volcanic rock, outside the boundaries of the city, because Roman law forbade burial places within city limits. Currently, maintenance of the catacombs is in the hands of the Papacy which has invested in the Salesians of Don Bosco the supervision of the Catacombs of St. Callixtus on the outskirts of Rome.

=== Entertainment and performing arts ===
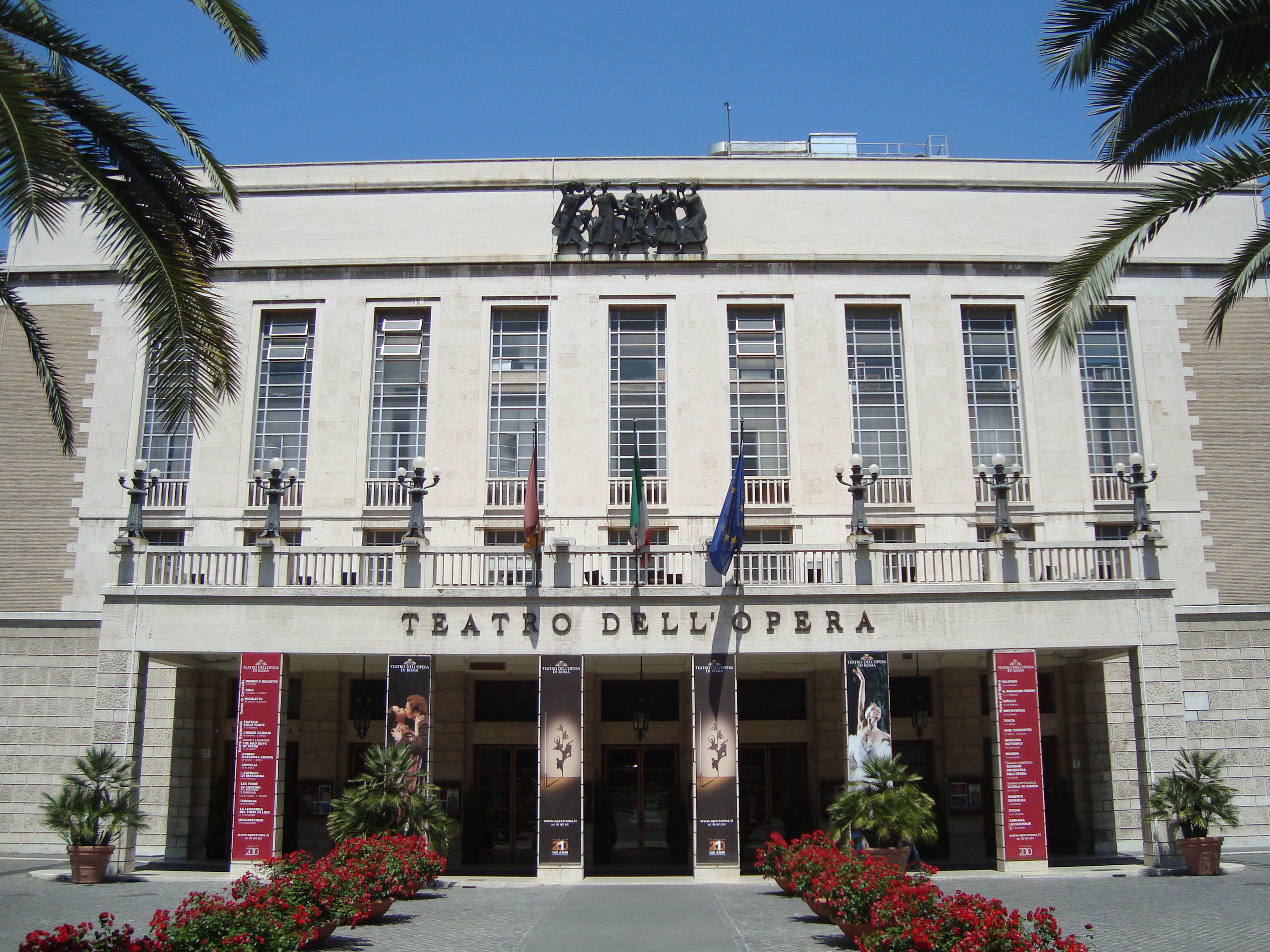
The Teatro dell'Opera di Roma at the Piazza Beniamino Gigli

Rome is an important centre for music, and it has an intense musical scene, including several prestigious music conservatories and theatres. It hosts the Accademia Nazionale di Santa Cecilia (founded in 1585), for which new concert halls have been built in the new Parco della Musica, one of the largest musical venues in the world. Rome also has an opera house, the Teatro dell'Opera di Roma, as well as several minor musical institutions. The city also played host to the Eurovision Song Contest in 1991 and the MTV Europe Music Awards in 2004.

Rome has also had a major impact on music history. The Roman School was a group of composers of predominantly church music, which were active in the city during the 16th and 17th centuries, therefore spanning the late Renaissance and early Baroque eras. The term also refers to the music they produced. Many of the composers had a direct connection to the Vatican and the papal chapel, though they worked at several churches; stylistically they are often contrasted with the Venetian School of composers, a concurrent movement which was much more progressive. By far the most famous composer of the Roman School is Giovanni Pierluigi da Palestrina, whose name has been associated for four hundred years with smooth, clear, polyphonic perfection. However, there were other composers working in Rome, and in a variety of styles and forms.

Between 1960 and 1970 Rome was considered to be as a "new Hollywood" because of the many actors and directors who worked there; Via Vittorio Veneto had transformed into a glamour place where you could meet famous people.

=== Fashion ===
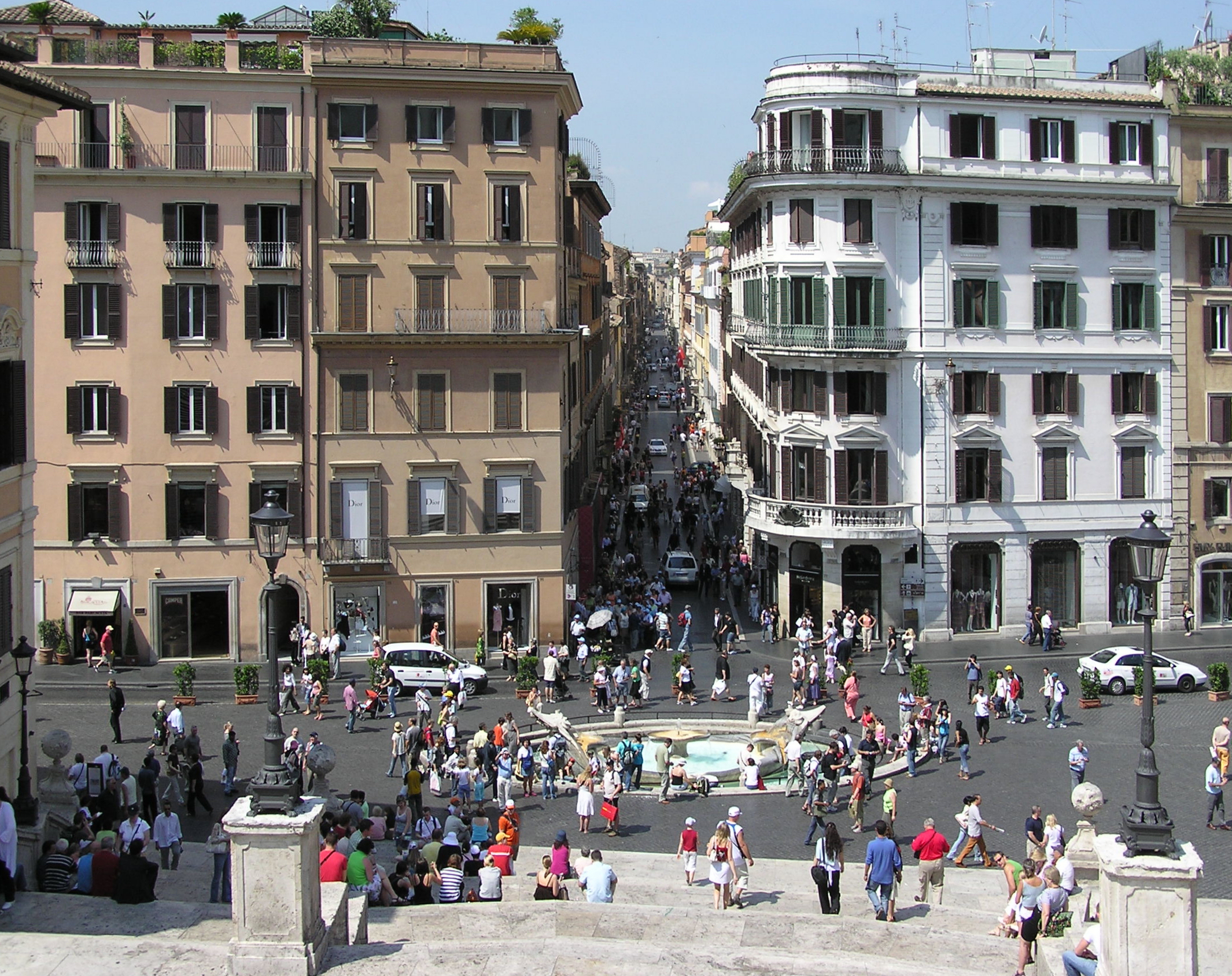
Via Condotti

Rome is also widely recognised as a world fashion capital. Although not as important as Milan, Rome is the fourth most important centre for fashion in the world, according to the 2009 Global Language Monitor after Milan, New York, and Paris, and beating London.

Major luxury fashion houses and jewellery chains, such as Valentino, Bulgari, Fendi, Laura Biagiotti, Brioni, and Renato Balestra, are headquartered or were founded in the city. Also, other major labels, such as Gucci, Chanel, Prada, Dolce & Gabbana, Armani, and Versace have luxury boutiques in Rome, primarily along its prestigious and upscale Via dei Condotti.

=== Cuisine ===
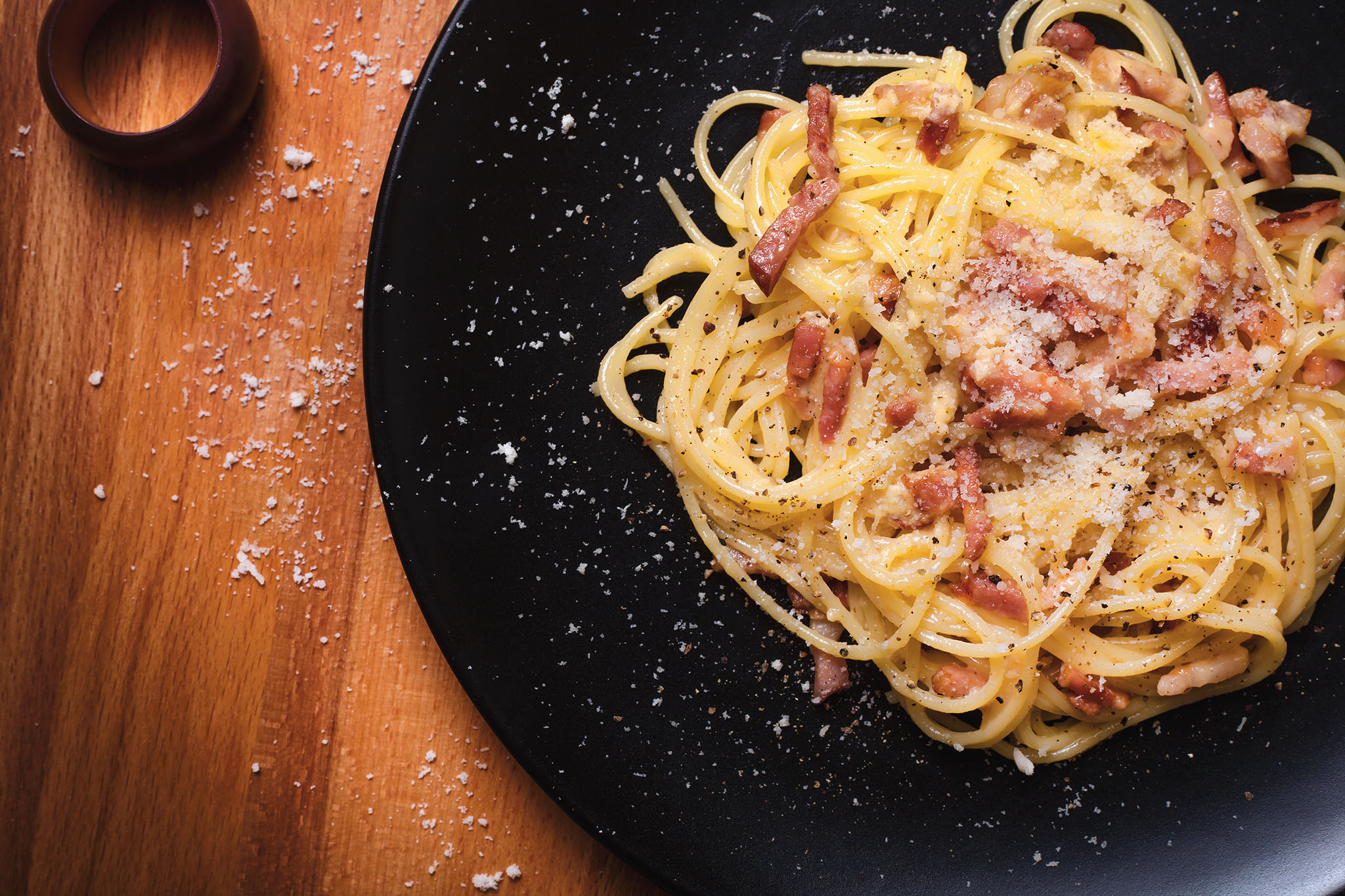
Spaghetti alla carbonara, a typical Roman dish

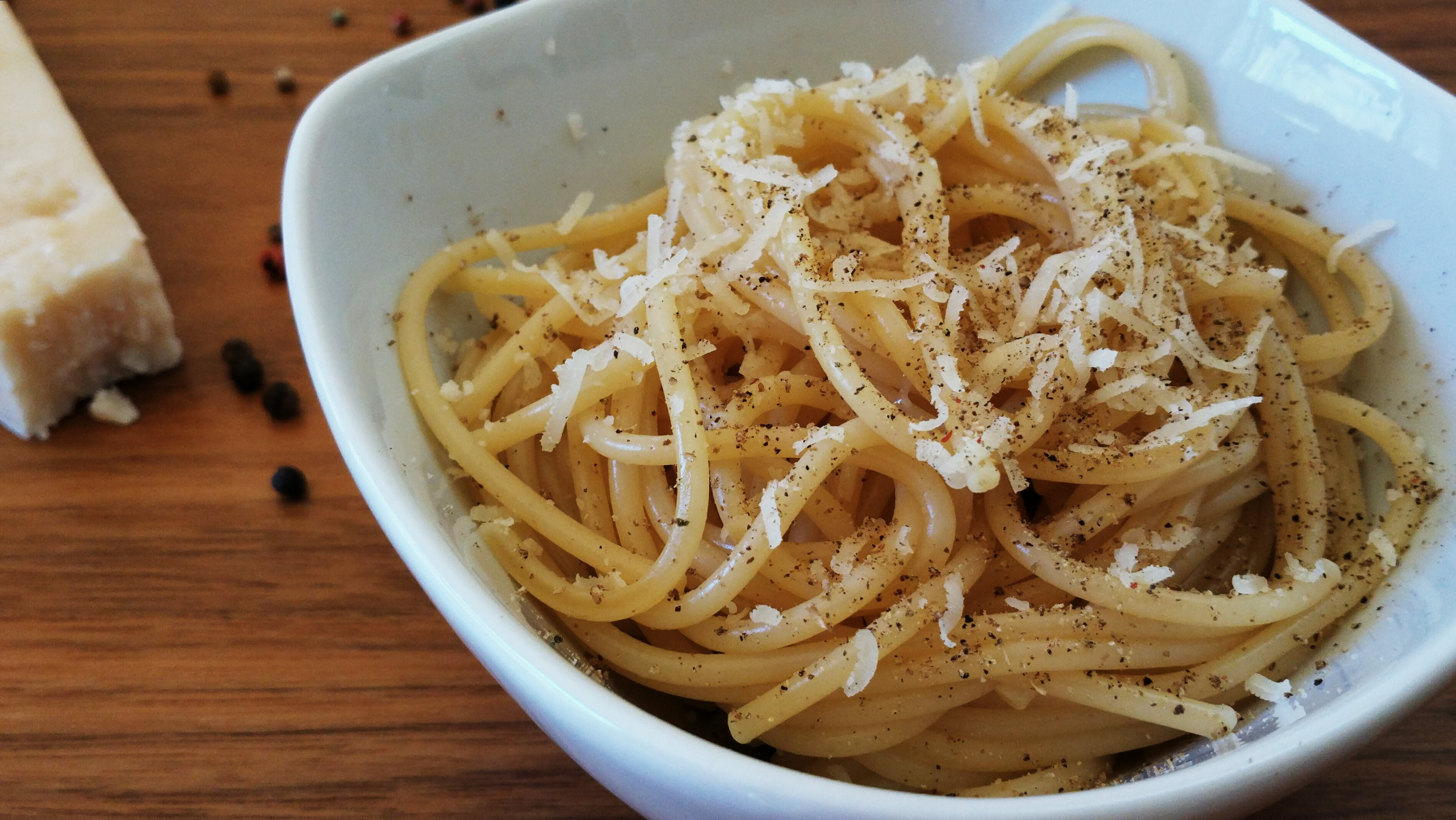
Spaghetti cacio e pepe, a typical Roman dish

Rome's cuisine has evolved through centuries and periods of social, cultural, and political changes. Rome became a major gastronomical centre during the ancient age. Ancient Roman cuisine was highly influenced by Ancient Greek culture, and after, the empire's enormous expansion exposed Romans to many new, provincial culinary habits and cooking techniques.

Later, during the Renaissance, Rome became well known as a centre of high-cuisine, since some of the best chefs of the time worked for the popes. An example of this was Bartolomeo Scappi, who was a chef working for Pius IV; he acquired fame in 1570 when his cookbook Opera dell'arte del cucinare was published. In the book he lists approximately 1,000 recipes of the Renaissance cuisine and describes cooking techniques and tools, giving the first known picture of a fork.

The Testaccio, Rome's trade and slaughterhouse area, was often known as the "belly" or "slaughterhouse" of Rome, and was inhabited by butchers, or vaccinari. The most common or ancient Roman cuisine included the "fifth quarter". The old-fashioned coda alla vaccinara (oxtail cooked in the way of butchers) is still one of the city's most popular meals and is part of most of Rome's restaurants' menus. Lamb is also a very popular part of Roman cuisine, and is often roasted with spices and herbs.

In the modern age, the city developed its own peculiar cuisine, based on products of the nearby Campagna, globe artichokes are common. In parallel, Roman Jews – present in the city since the 1st century BC – developed their own cuisine, the cucina giudaico-romanesca. The Roman cuisine widely use offal, resulting in dishes such as the entrail-based rigatoni with pajata sauce. Abbacchio is a meat dish based on lamb from the Roman cuisine.

Examples of Roman dishes include saltimbocca alla romana – a veal cutlet, Roman-style, topped with raw ham and sage and simmered with white wine and butter; carciofi alla romana – artichokes Roman-style, outer leaves removed, stuffed with mint, garlic, breadcrumbs and braised; carciofi alla giudia – artichokes fried in olive oil, typical of Roman Jewish cooking, outer leaves removed, stuffed with mint, garlic, breadcrumbs and braised; spaghetti alla carbonara – spaghetti with bacon, eggs and pecorino romano; spaghetti cacio e pepe – spaghetti with pecorino romano and black pepper; and gnocchi di semolino alla romana – semolina dumpling, Roman-style.

=== Cinema ===
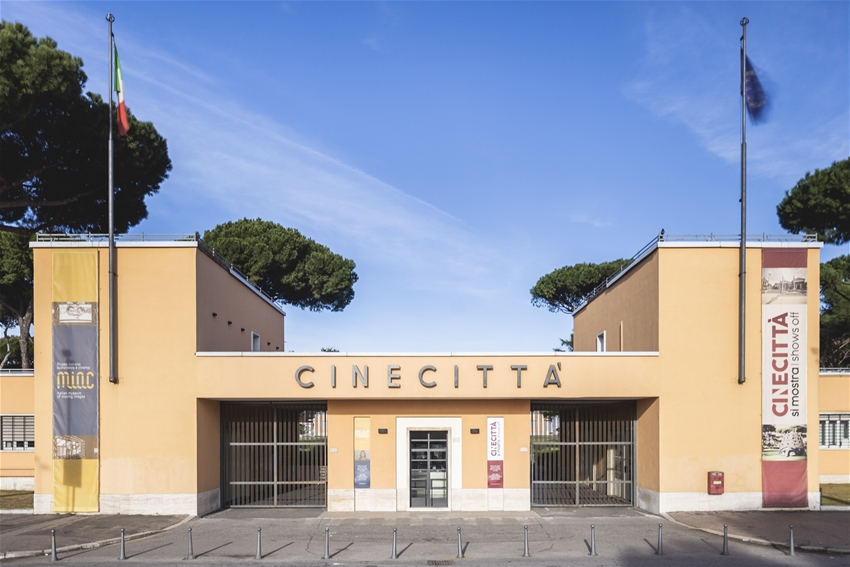
Entrance to the Cinecittà studios, the largest film studio in Europe

Rome hosts the Cinecittà Studios, the largest film and television production facility in continental Europe and the centre of the Italian cinema, where many of today's biggest box office hits are filmed. The 99-acre (40 ha) studio complex is 9.0 km (5.6 mi) from the centre of Rome and is part of one of the biggest production communities in the world, second only to Hollywood, with well over 5,000 professionals – from period costume makers to visual effects specialists. More than 3,000 productions have been made on its lot.

Founded in 1937 by Benito Mussolini, the studios were bombed by the Western Allies during the Second World War. In the 1950s, Cinecittà was the filming location for several large American film productions, and subsequently became the studio most closely associated with Federico Fellini. Today, Cinecittà is the only studio in the world with pre-production, production, and full post-production facilities on one lot, allowing directors and producers to walk in with their script and "walkout" with a completed film.

=== Sports ===
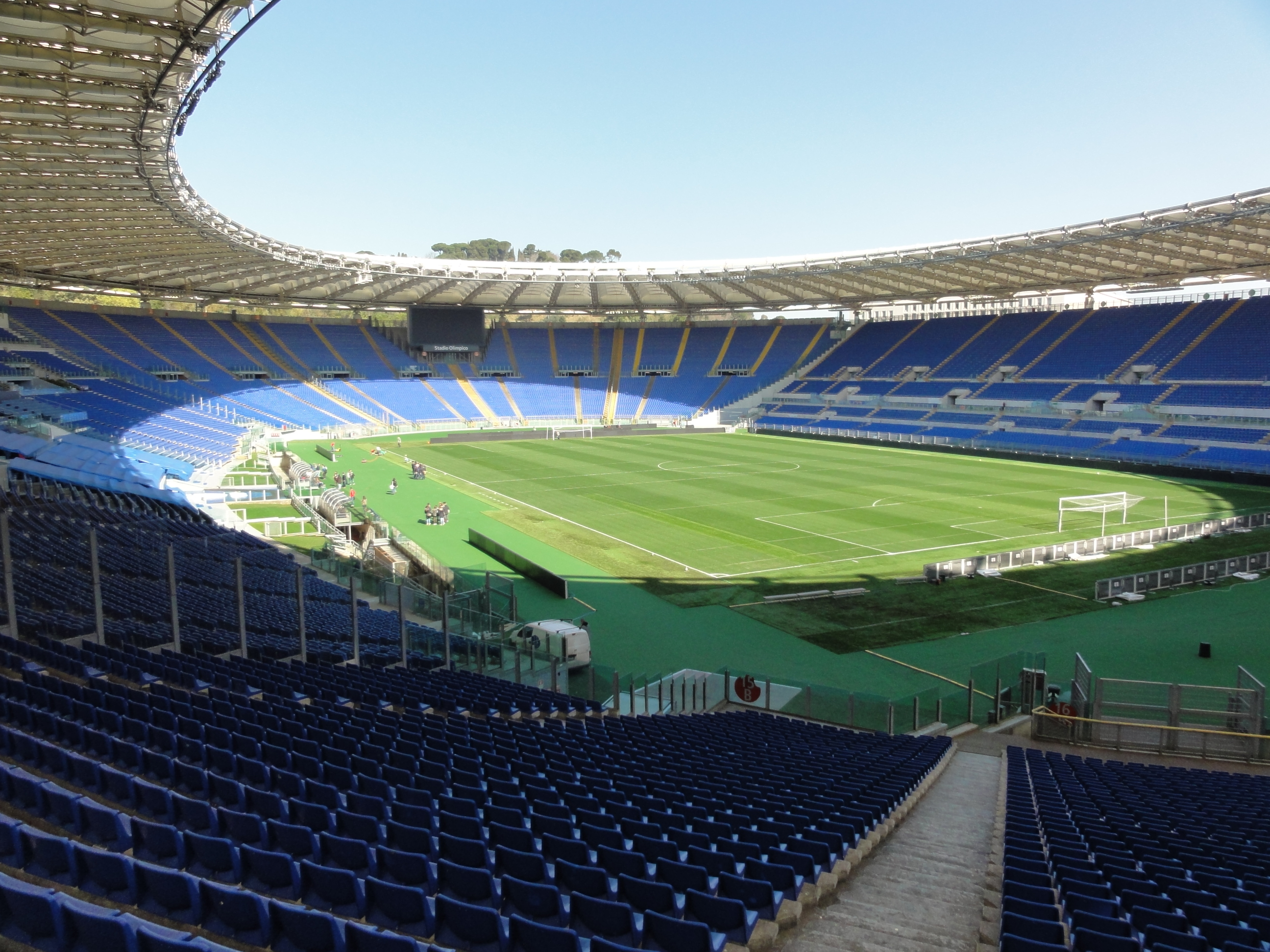
Stadio Olimpico, home of AS Roma and SS Lazio, is one of the largest sports stadiums in Europe, with a capacity of over 70,000.

Association football is the most popular sport in Rome, as in the rest of the country. The city hosted the final games of the 1934 and 1990 FIFA World Cup. The latter took place in the Stadio Olimpico, which is also the shared home stadium for local Serie A clubs SS Lazio, founded in 1900, and AS Roma, founded in 1927, whose rivalry in the Derby della Capitale has become a staple of Roman sports culture. Footballers who play for these teams and are also born in the city tend to become especially popular, as has been the case with players such as Francesco Totti and Daniele De Rossi (both for AS Roma), and Alessandro Nesta (for SS Lazio).

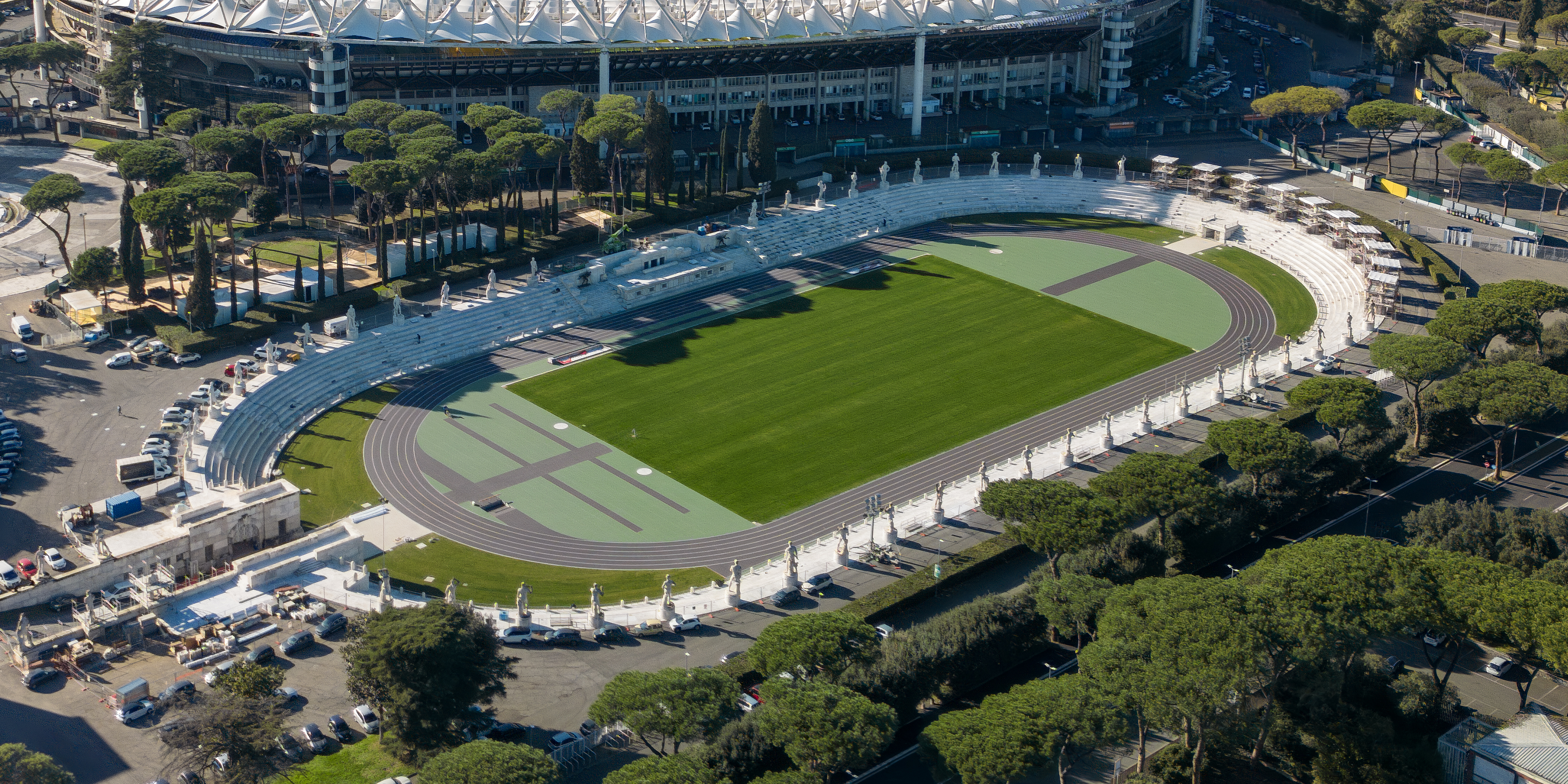
Stadio dei Marmi

Rome hosted the 1960 Summer Olympics, with great success, using many ancient sites such as the Villa Borghese and the Thermae of Caracalla as venues. For the Olympic Games many new facilities were built, notably the new large Olympic Stadium (which was then enlarged and renewed to host several matches and the final of the 1990 FIFA World Cup), the Stadio Flaminio, the Villaggio Olimpico (Olympic Village, created to host the athletes and redeveloped after the games as a residential district), ecc. Rome made a bid to host the 2020 Summer Olympics but it was withdrawn.

Further, Rome hosted the EuroBasket 1991 and is home to the internationally recognised basketball team Virtus Roma. Rugby union is gaining wider acceptance. Until 2011 the Stadio Flaminio was the home stadium for the Italy national rugby union team, which has been playing in the Six Nations Championship since 2000. The team now plays home games at the Stadio Olimpico because the Stadio Flaminio needs works of renovation in order to improve both its capacity and safety. Rome is home to local rugby union teams such as Rugby Roma (winner of five Italian championships), Unione Rugby Capitolina and S.S. Lazio Rugby 1927 (rugby union branch of the multisport club S.S. Lazio).

Every May, Rome hosts the Italian Open, an ATP Masters 1000 tennis tournament, on the clay courts of the Foro Italico. Cycling was popular in the post-World War II period, although its popularity has faded. Rome has hosted the final portion of the Giro d'Italia three times, in 1911, 1950, and 2009. Other local sports teams include volleyball (M. Roma Volley), handball or waterpolo.

== Economy ==
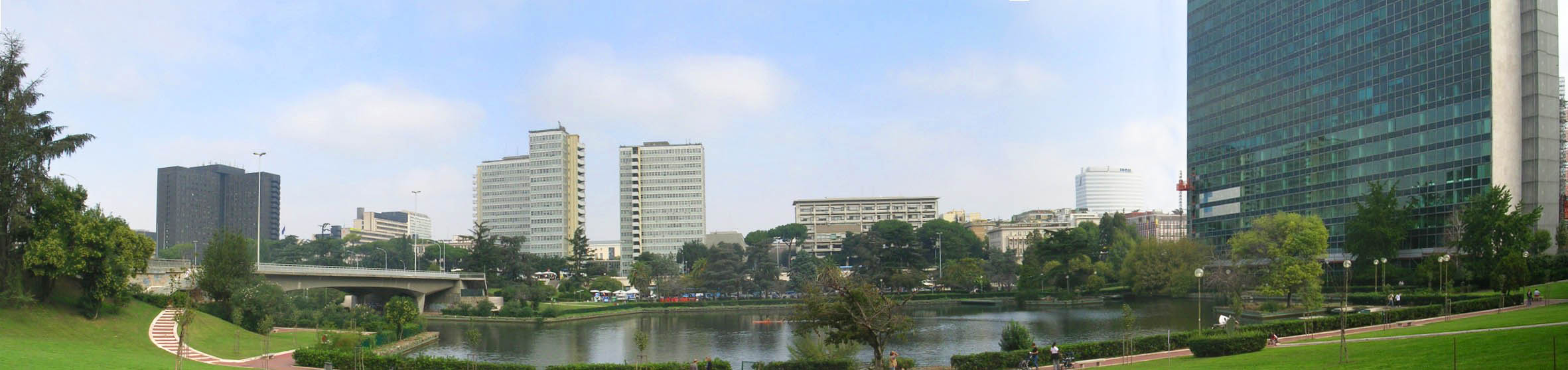
Panoramic view of the EUR business district

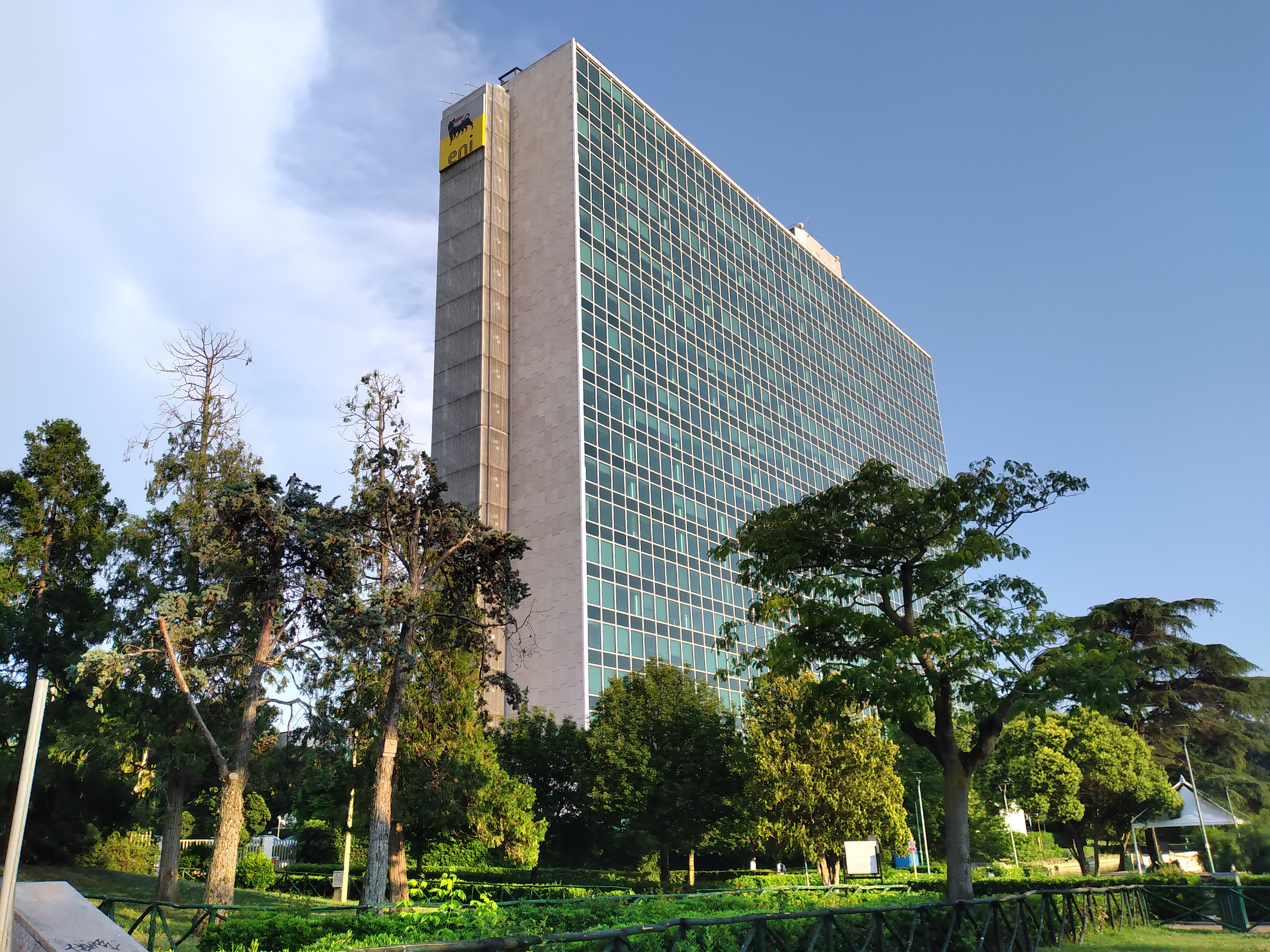
Palazzo Eni, the headquarters of Eni, one of the world's oil and gas "supermajors"

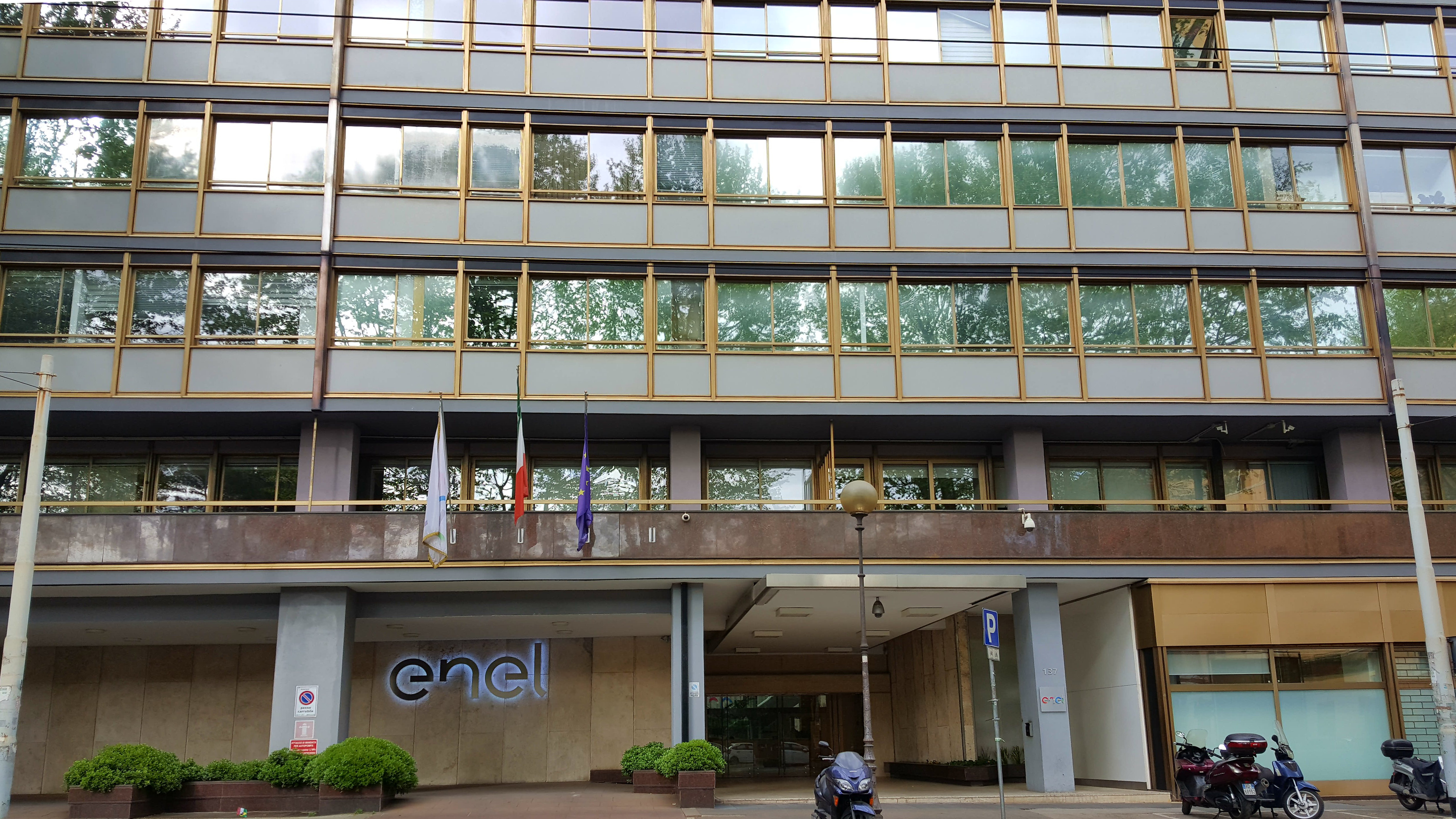
Enel's headquarters in Rome, the second largest power company in the world by revenue after the State Grid Corporation of China

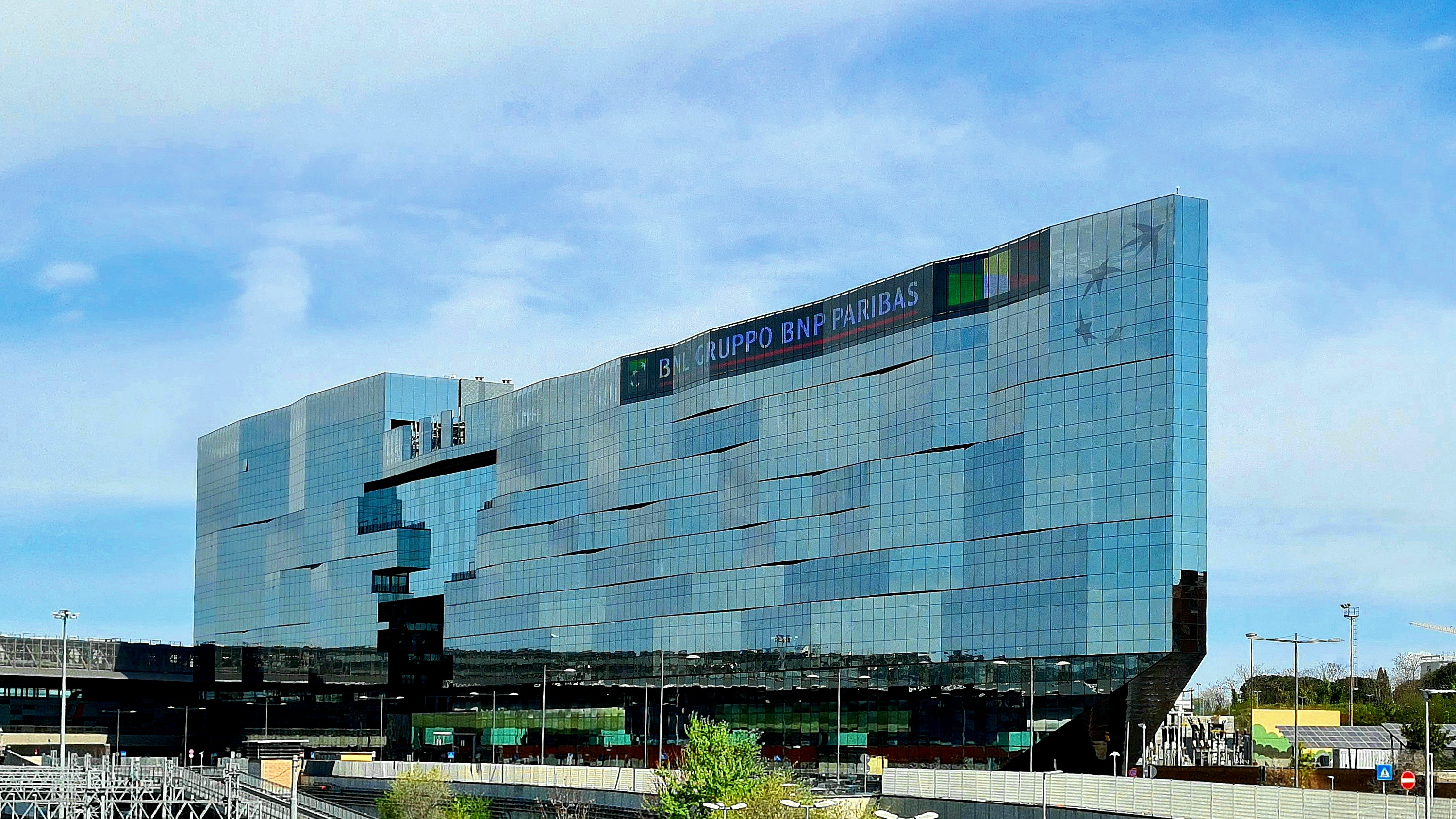
Orizzonte Europa, BNL headquarters in Rome

As the capital of Italy, Rome hosts the country's principal political institutions, including the Presidency of the Republic, the government and its ministries, the Parliament, and the country's highest judicial institutions. The city is also home to the diplomatic missions accredited to Italy and to the Holy See. Rome hosts numerous international institutions and cultural and scientific organisations, including the American Academy in Rome, the British School at Rome, the French Academy at Rome, the German Archaeological Institute, and several Scandinavian research institutes. There are also several specialised agencies and organisations of the United Nations based in Rome, notably the Food and Agriculture Organization (FAO), the International Fund for Agricultural Development (IFAD), and the World Food Programme (WFP). Rome is also home to the NATO Defense College and the International Centre for the Study of the Preservation and Restoration of Cultural Property (ICCROM).

According to the Globalization and World Cities Research Network (GaWC), Rome was classified as a "Beta+" world city in 2024. In the 2025 Kearney Global Cities Index, Rome ranked 27th worldwide, rising four places from 31st in 2024 and ranking ahead of Milan, which placed 30th.

Rome's economy is predominantly service-based, with major sectors including public administration, tourism, commerce, finance and insurance, information technology, telecommunications, aerospace and defence, research, construction, media, and the creative industries. The city is also an important centre for energy, transport, professional services, and higher education. Rome hosts the headquarters of several of Italy's largest companies, including Enel, Eni, Leonardo, Poste Italiane, and Ferrovie dello Stato Italiane.

Leonardo da Vinci–Fiumicino Airport, the principal airport serving Rome, is the busiest airport in Italy. In 2025, it handled approximately 50.9 million arriving and departing passengers, exceeding the 50-million-passenger threshold for the first time; including direct transit passengers, total traffic amounted to approximately 51.3 million. It is also one of Europe's major international aviation hubs. And for the eighth time since 2018, and for the fifth consecutive year, ACI has ranked the airport as the best airport in Europe.

Rome is an important centre for higher education, research, broadcasting, and film production. The city is home to Cinecittà, one of the principal centres of the Italian film industry, which has operated since its establishment in the 1930s.

The city's principal concentrations of modern office, commercial, and business activity include EUR, Torrino, Magliana, Parco de' Medici, and the Tiburtina Valley, particularly along the Via Tiburtina. Other important concentrations of economic and professional activity are found in the city centre and in areas such as Ostiense and Flaminio.

=== Tourism ===
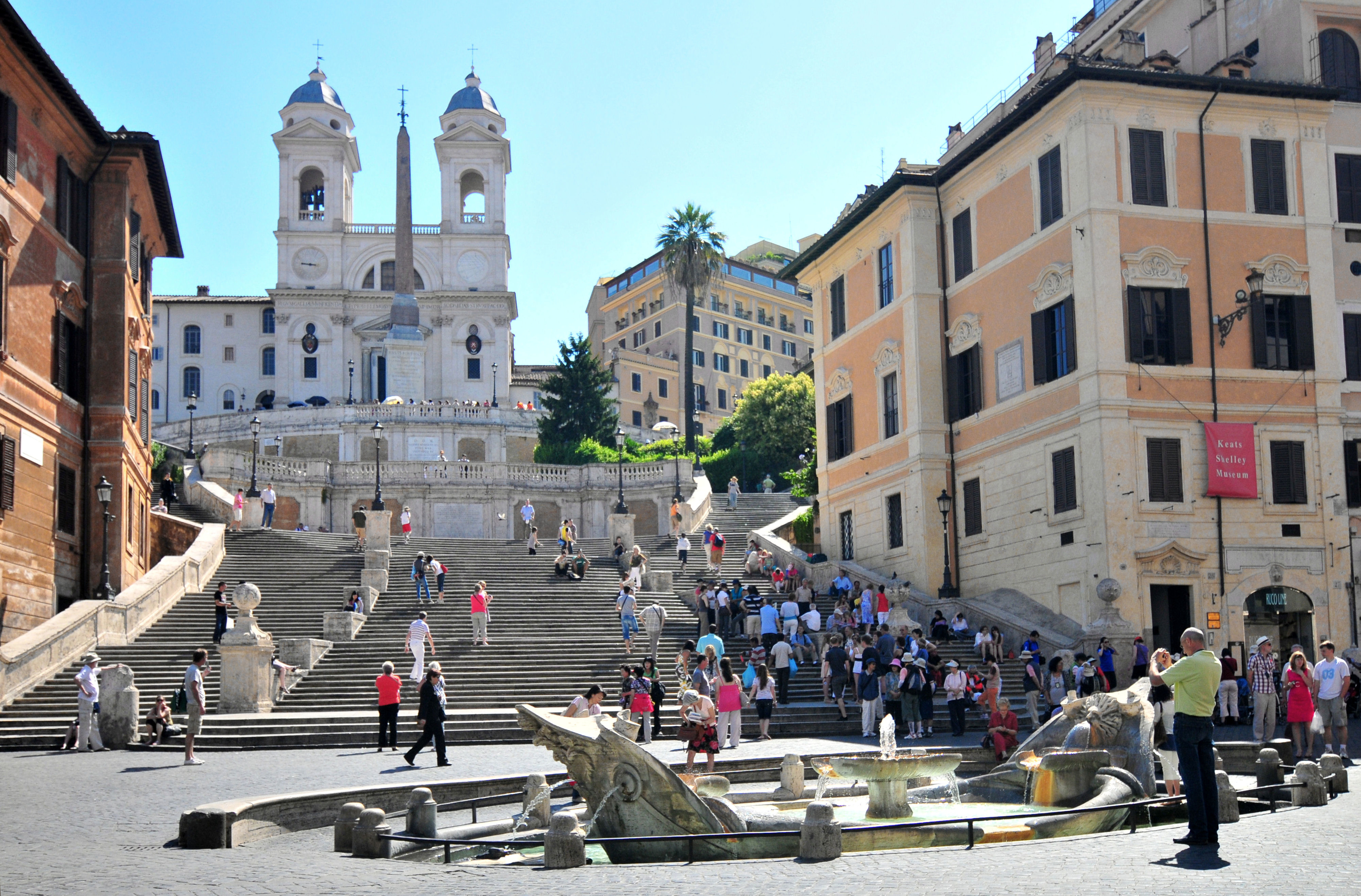
Fontana della Barcaccia in Piazza di Spagna, the Spanish Steps and Trinità dei Monti

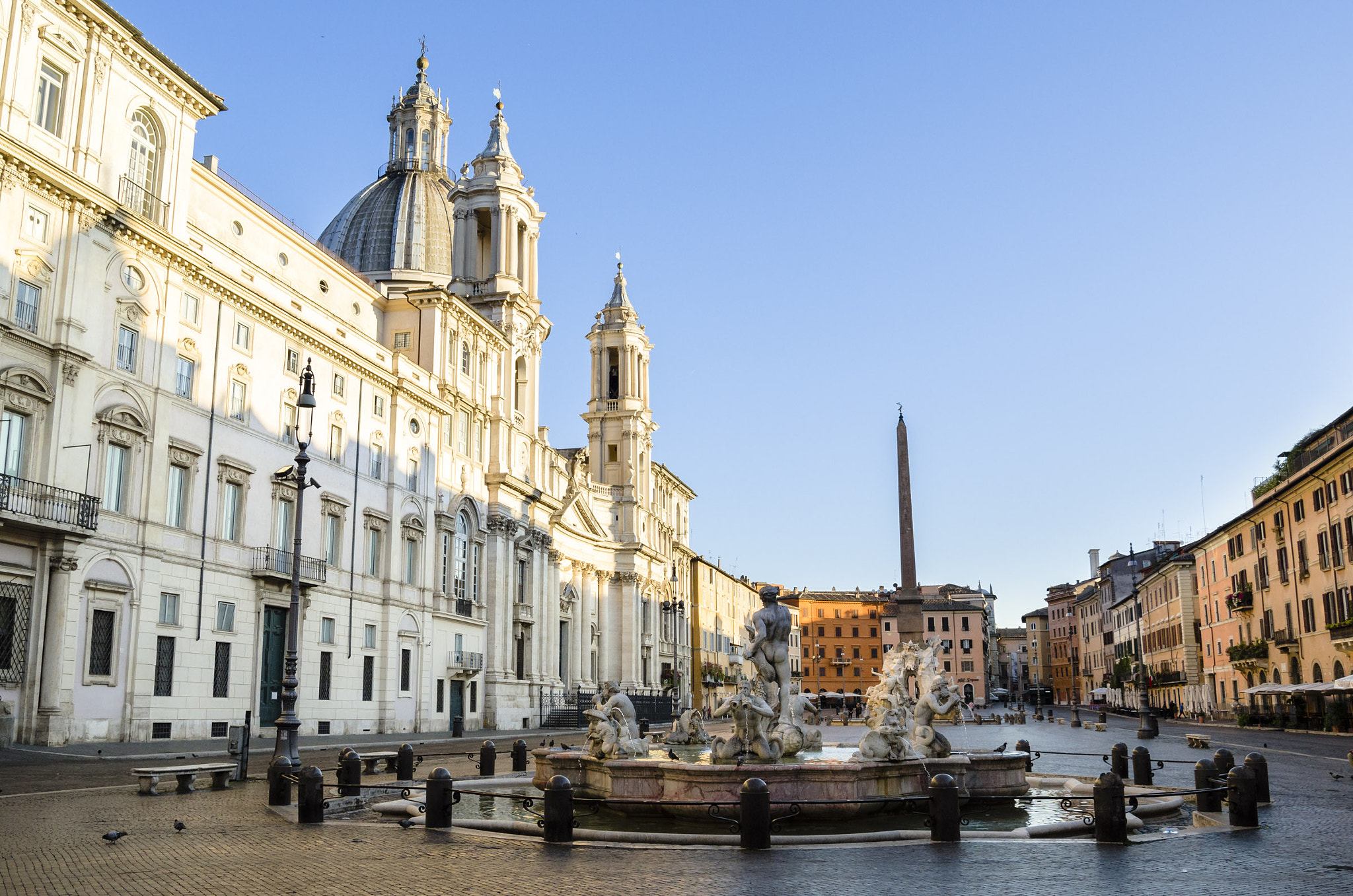
Piazza Navona

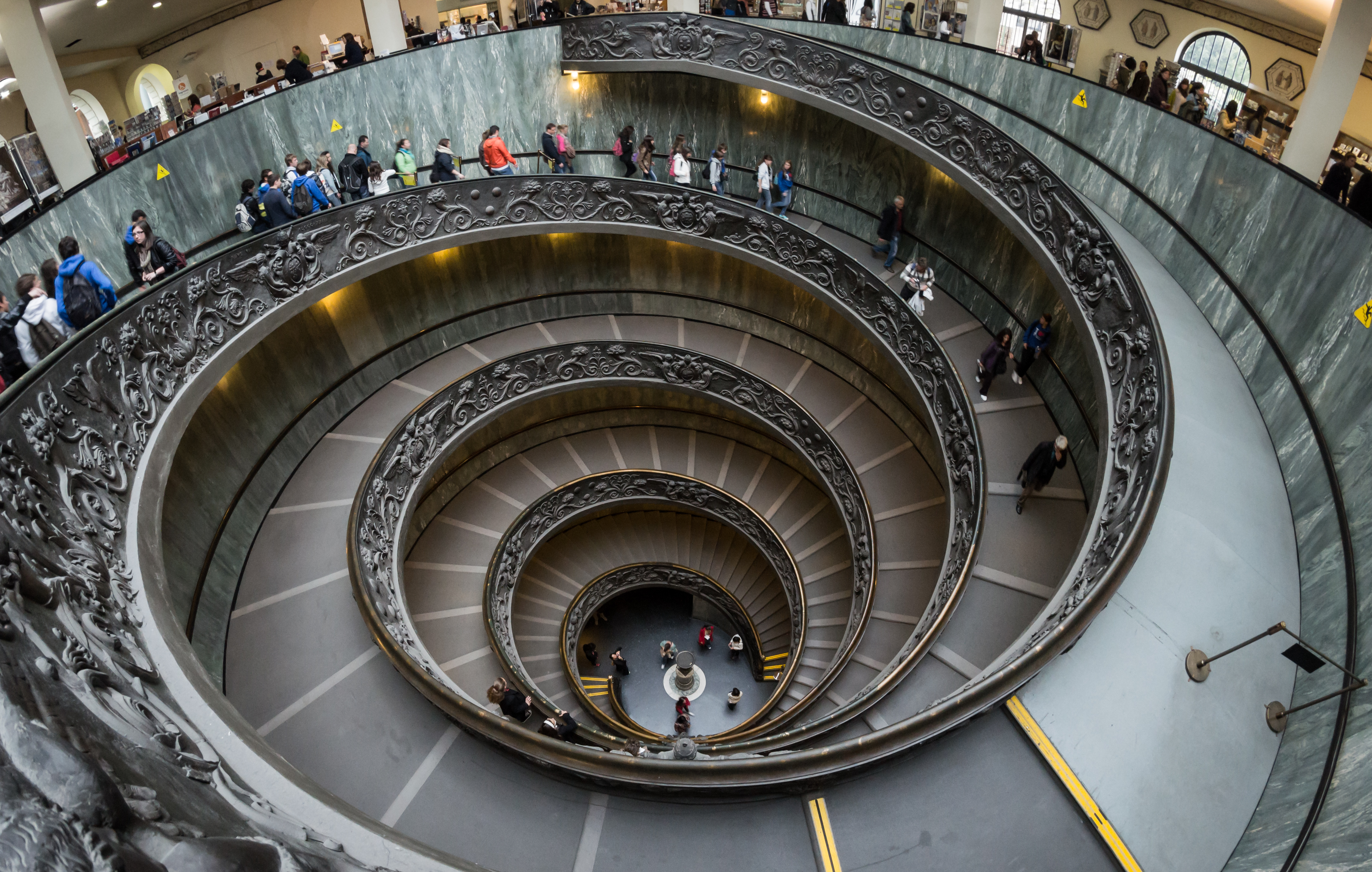
As of 2022, the Vatican Museums are the second most visited art museum in the world.

Rome today is one of the most important tourist destinations of the world, due to the incalculable immensity of its archaeological and artistic treasures, as well as for the charm of its unique traditions, the beauty of its panoramic views, and the majesty of its magnificent "villas" (parks). Among the most significant resources are the many museums – Capitoline Museums, the Vatican Museums and the Galleria Borghese and others dedicated to modern and contemporary art – aqueducts, fountains, churches, palaces, historical buildings, the monuments and ruins of the Roman Forum, and the Catacombs. Rome is the third most visited city in the EU, after London and Paris, and receives an average of 7–10 million tourists a year, which sometimes doubles on holy years. The Colosseum (4 million tourists) and the Vatican Museums (4.2 million tourists) are the 39th and 37th (respectively) most visited places in the world, according to a recent study.

Rome is a major archaeological hub, and one of the world's main centres of archaeological research. There are numerous cultural and research institutes located in the city, such as the American Academy in Rome, and The Swedish Institute at Rome. Rome contains numerous ancient sites, including the Forum Romanum, Trajan's Market, Trajan's Forum, the Colosseum, and the Pantheon, to name but a few. The Colosseum, arguably one of Rome's most iconic archaeological sites, is regarded as a wonder of the world.

Rome contains a vast collection of art, sculpture, fountains, mosaics, frescos, and paintings, from all different periods. Rome first became a major artistic centre during ancient Rome, with forms of important Roman art such as architecture, painting, sculpture and mosaic work. Metal-work, coin die and gem engraving, ivory carvings, figurine glass, pottery, and book illustrations are considered to be 'minor' forms of Roman artwork. Rome later became a major centre of Renaissance art, since the popes spent vast sums of money for the constructions of grandiose basilicas, palaces, piazzas and public buildings in general. Rome became one of Europe's major centres of Renaissance artwork along with Florence, and able to compare to other major cities and cultural centres, such as Paris and Venice. Some of the greatest artists of this time found work in Rome: Michelangelo, Raffaello Sanzio, Donato Bramante, Sandro Botticelli, Ghirlandaio, Piero della Francesca, Pietro Perugino, Cosimo Rosselli, Gentile da Fabriano, Beato Angelico, Leon Battista Alberti, Giovanni Battista Penni, Giulio Romano, Rosso Fiorentino, Parmigianino, Bernardo Rossellino, Benozzo Gozzoli, Pisanello and others. The city was affected greatly by the baroque, and Rome became the home of numerous artists and architects, such as Bernini, Caravaggio, Carracci, Borromini, Stefano Maderno, Francesco Mochi, Domenichino, Pietro Paolo Rubens, Guido Reni, Diego Velázquez, Artemisia Gentileschi, Orazio Gentileschi, Andrea Pozzo, Baciccia and Cortona. In the late 18th century and early 19th century, the city was one of the centres of the Grand Tour, when wealthy, young English and other European aristocrats visited the city to learn about ancient Roman culture, art, philosophy, and architecture. Rome hosted a great number of neoclassical and rococo artists, such as Pannini and Bernardo Bellotto. Today, the city is a major artistic centre, with numerous art institutes and museums.

Rome has a growing stock of contemporary and modern art and architecture. The National Gallery of Modern Art has works by Balla, Morandi, Pirandello, Carrà, De Chirico, De Pisis, Guttuso, Fontana, Burri, Mastroianni, Turcato, Kandisky, and Cézanne on permanent exhibition. 2010 saw the opening of Rome's newest arts foundation, a contemporary art and architecture gallery designed by acclaimed Iraqi architect Zaha Hadid. Known as MAXXI – National Museum of the 21st Century Arts it restores a dilapidated area with striking modern architecture. Maxxi features a campus dedicated to culture, experimental research laboratories, international exchange and study and research. It is one of Rome's most ambitious modern architecture projects alongside Renzo Piano's Auditorium Parco della Musica and Massimiliano Fuksas' Rome Convention Center, Centro Congressi Italia EUR, in the EUR district, due to open in 2016. The convention centre features a huge translucent container inside which is suspended a steel and teflon structure resembling a cloud and which contains meeting rooms and an auditorium with two piazzas open to the neighbourhood on either side.

== Education ==
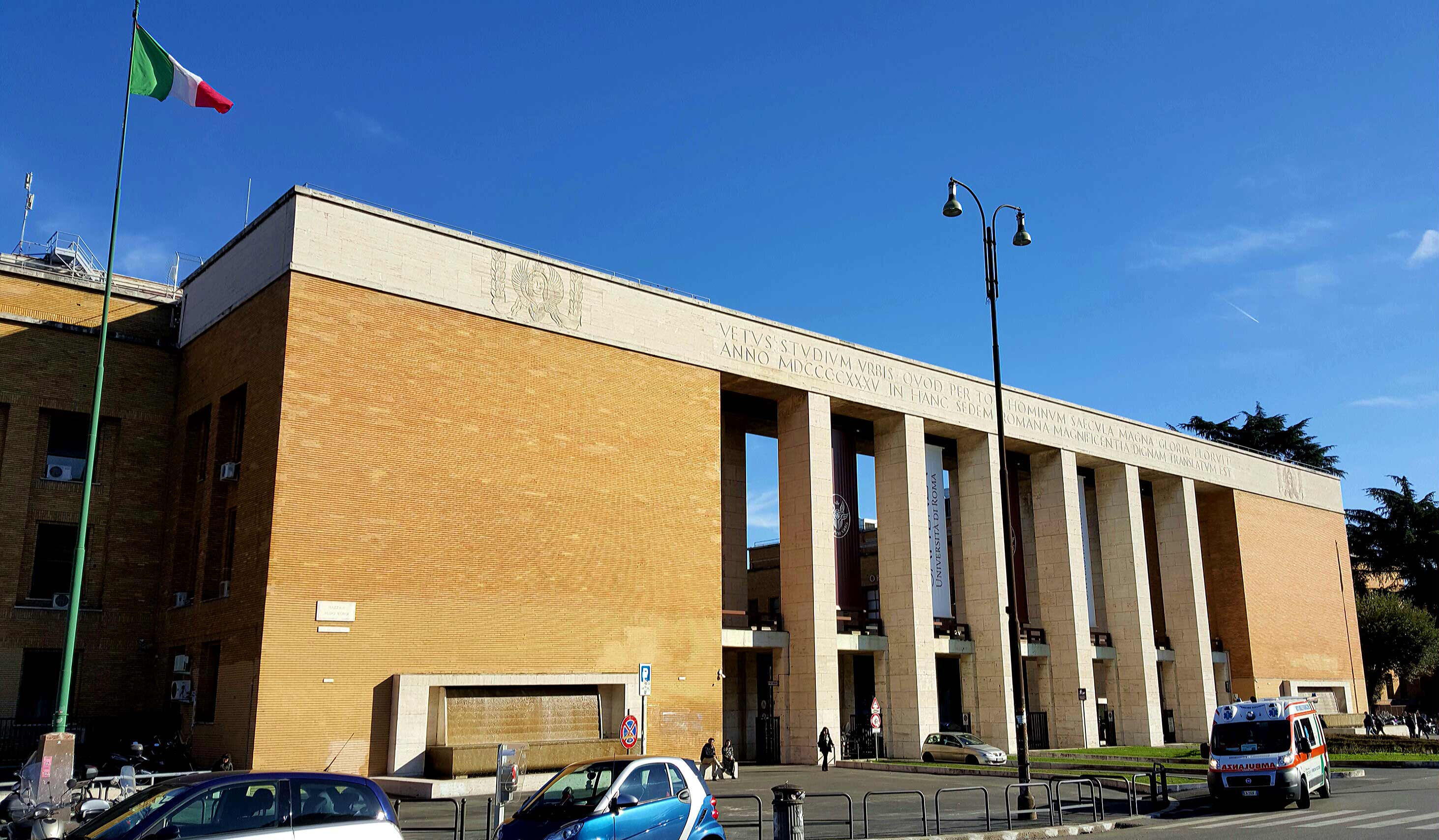
Sapienza University of Rome. It was founded in 1303 and is as such one of the world's oldest universities, and with 122,000 students, it is the largest university in Europe.

Rome is a nationwide and major international centre for higher education, containing numerous academies, colleges and universities. It boasts a large variety of academies and colleges, and has always been a major worldwide intellectual and educational centre, especially during Ancient Rome and the Renaissance, along with Florence. According to the City Brands Index, Rome is considered the world's second most historically, educationally and culturally interesting and beautiful city.

Rome has many universities and colleges. Its first university, La Sapienza (founded in 1303), is one of the largest in the world, with more than 140,000 students attending; in 2005 it ranked as Europe's 33rd best university and in 2013 the Sapienza University of Rome ranked as the 62nd in the world and the top in Italy in its World University Rankings, and has been ranked among Europe's 50 and the world's 150 best colleges. In order to decrease the overcrowding of La Sapienza, two new public universities were founded during the last decades: Tor Vergata in 1982, and Roma Tre in 1992. Rome hosts also the LUISS School of Government, Italy's most important graduate university in the areas of international affairs and European studies as well as LUISS Business School, Italy's most important business school. Rome ISIA was founded in 1973 by Giulio Carlo Argan and is Italy's oldest institution in the field of industrial design.

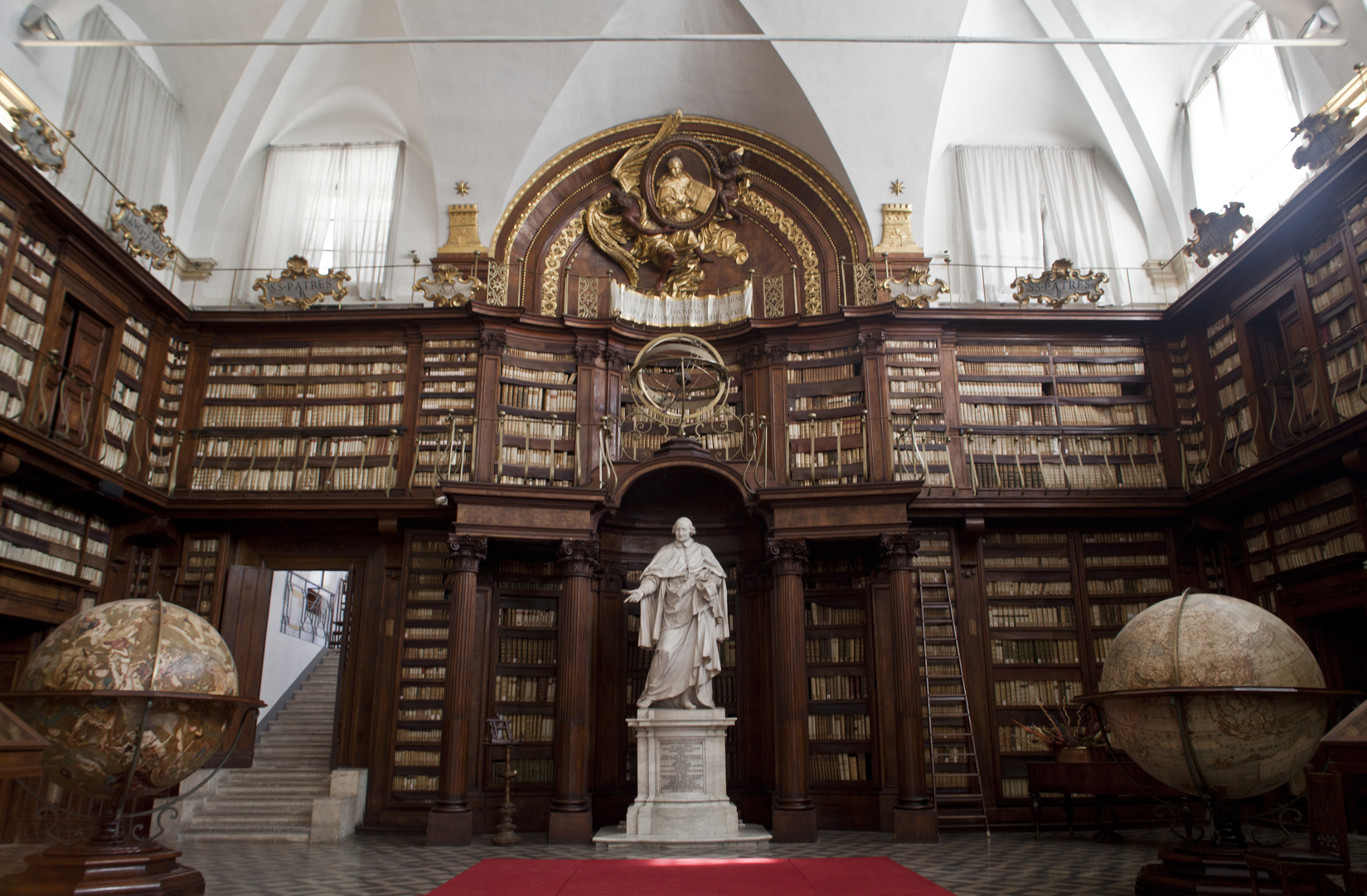
Biblioteca Casanatense

Rome contains many pontifical universities and other institutes, including the British School at Rome, the French Academy in Rome, the Pontifical Gregorian University (the oldest Jesuit university in the world, founded in 1551), Istituto Europeo di Design, the Scuola Lorenzo de' Medici, the Link Campus of Malta, and the Università Campus Bio-Medico. Rome is also the location of two American Universities; The American University of Rome and John Cabot University as well as St. John's University branch campus, John Felice Rome Center, a campus of Loyola University Chicago and Temple University Rome, a campus of Temple University. The Roman Colleges are several seminaries for students from foreign countries studying for the priesthood at the Pontifical Universities. Examples include the Venerable English College, the Pontifical North American College, the Scots College, and the Pontifical Croatian College of St. Jerome. Rome's major libraries include: the Biblioteca Angelica, opened in 1604, making it Italy's first public library; the Biblioteca Vallicelliana, established in 1565; the Biblioteca Casanatense, opened in 1701; the National Central Library, one of the two national libraries in Italy, which contains 4,126,002 volumes; The Biblioteca del Ministero degli Affari Esteri, specialised in diplomacy, foreign affairs and modern history; the Biblioteca dell'Istituto dell'Enciclopedia Italiana; the Biblioteca Don Bosco, one of the largest and most modern of all Salesian libraries; the Biblioteca e Museo teatrale del Burcardo, a museum-library specialised in history of drama and theatre; the Biblioteca della Società Geografica Italiana, which is based in the Villa Celimontana and is the most important geographical library in Italy, and one of Europe's most important; and the Vatican Library, one of the oldest and most important libraries in the world, which was formally established in 1475, though in fact much older and has 75,000 codices, as well as 1.1 million printed books, which include some 8,500 incunabula. There are also many specialist libraries attached to various foreign cultural institutes in Rome, among them that of the American Academy in Rome, the French Academy in Rome and the Bibliotheca Hertziana – Max Planck Institute of Art History, a German library, often noted for excellence in the arts and sciences.

== Transport ==
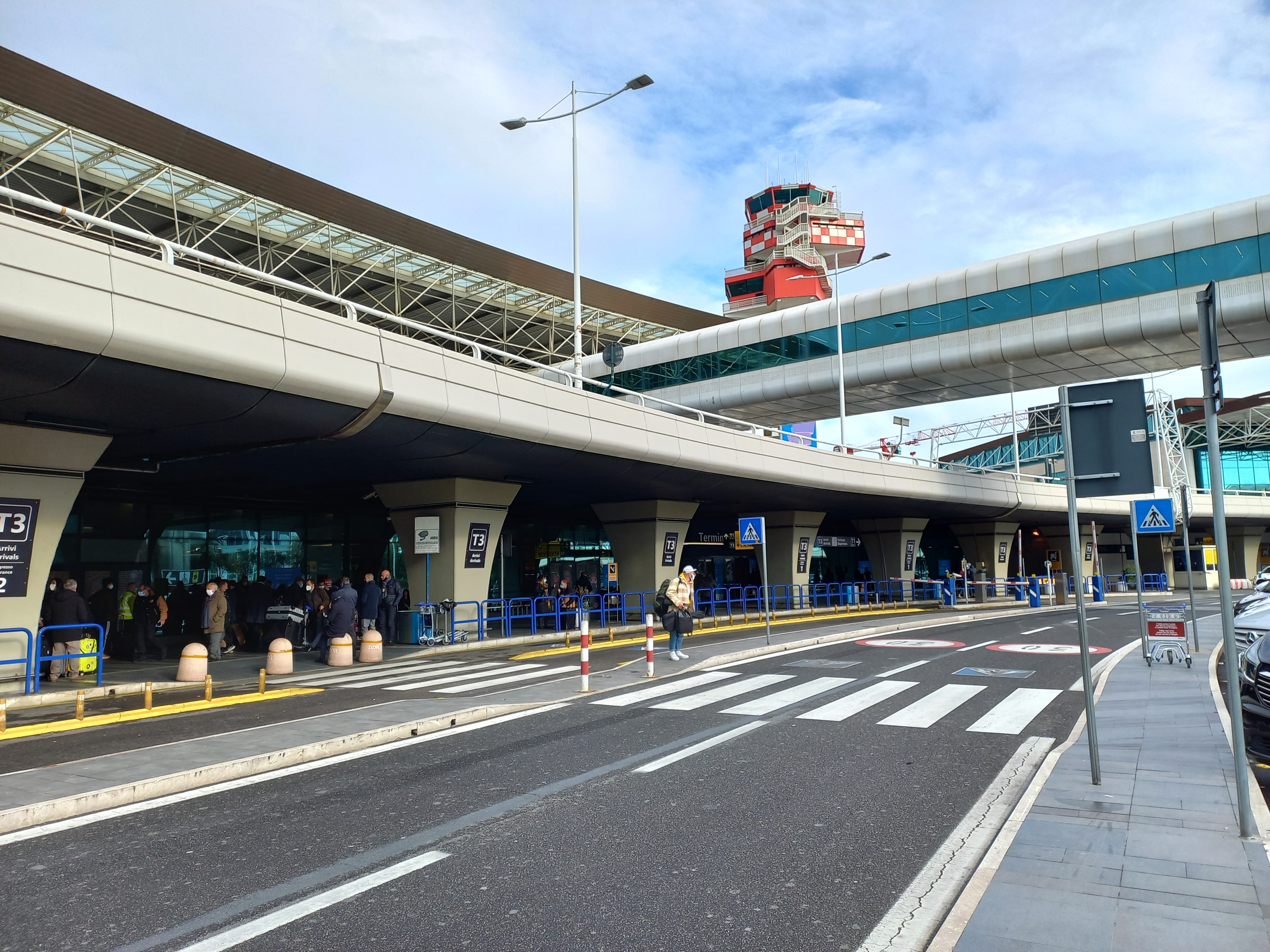
Leonardo da Vinci–Fiumicino Airport

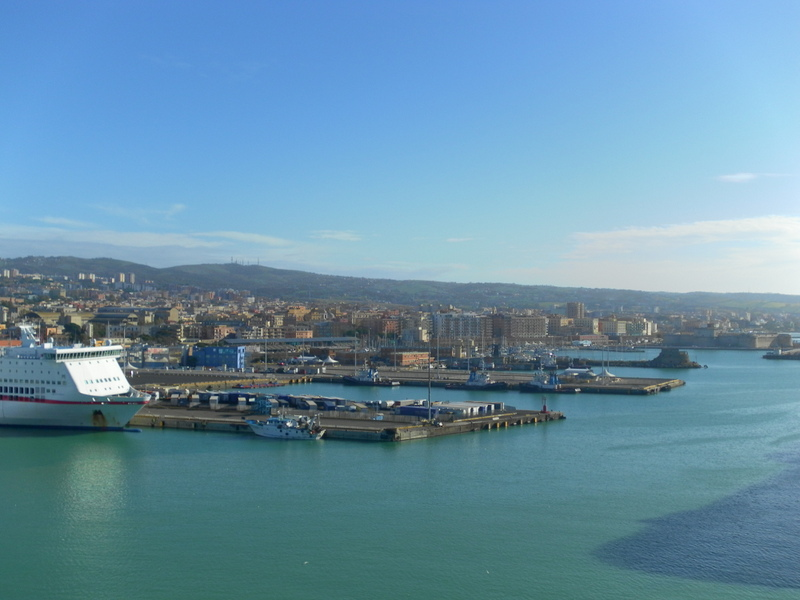
Port of Civitavecchia

Rome is at the centre of the radial network of roads that roughly follow the lines of the ancient Roman roads which began at the Capitoline Hill and connected Rome with its empire. Today central Rome is circled, at a distance of about 10 km (6 mi) from the Capitol, by the ring-road (the Grande Raccordo Anulare or GRA).

Due to its location in the centre of the Italian peninsula, Rome is the principal railway node for central Italy. Rome's main railway station, Termini, is one of the largest railway stations in Europe and the most heavily used in Italy, with around 400 thousand travellers passing through every day. The second-largest station in the city, Roma Tiburtina, has been redeveloped as a high-speed rail terminus. As well as frequent high-speed day trains to all major Italian cities, Rome is linked nightly by 'boat train' sleeper services to Sicily, and internationally by overnight sleeper services to Munich and Vienna.

Rome is served by three airports. The intercontinental Leonardo da Vinci International Airport, Italy's chief airport is located in the nearby Fiumicino, south-west of Rome. The older Rome Ciampino Airport is a joint civilian and military airport. It is commonly referred to as "Ciampino Airport", as it is located beside Ciampino, south-east of Rome. A third airport, the Rome Urbe Airport, is a small, low-traffic airport located about 6 km (4 mi) north of the city centre, which handles most helicopter and private flights. The main city airport of Fiumicino, with over 49 million passengers transported in 2024, is the largest and busiest airport in Italy.

Although the city has its own quarter on the Mediterranean Sea (Lido di Ostia), this has only a marina and a small channel-harbour for fishing boats. The main harbour which serves Rome is Port of Civitavecchia, located about 62 km (39 mi) northwest of the city.

The city suffers from traffic problems largely due to this radial street pattern, making it difficult for Romans to move easily from the vicinity of one of the radial roads to another without going into the historic centre or using the ring-road. These problems are not helped by the limited size of Rome's metro system when compared to other cities of similar size. Rome has only 21 taxis for every 10,000 inhabitants, far below other major European cities. Chronic congestion caused by cars during the 1970s and 1980s led to restrictions being placed on vehicle access to the inner city-centre during daylight hours. Areas, where these restrictions apply, are known as Limited Traffic Zones (Zona a Traffico Limitato (ZTL)). More recently, heavy night-time traffic in Trastevere, Testaccio and San Lorenzo has led to the creation of night-time ZTLs in those districts.

Rome Metro map updated to 2026

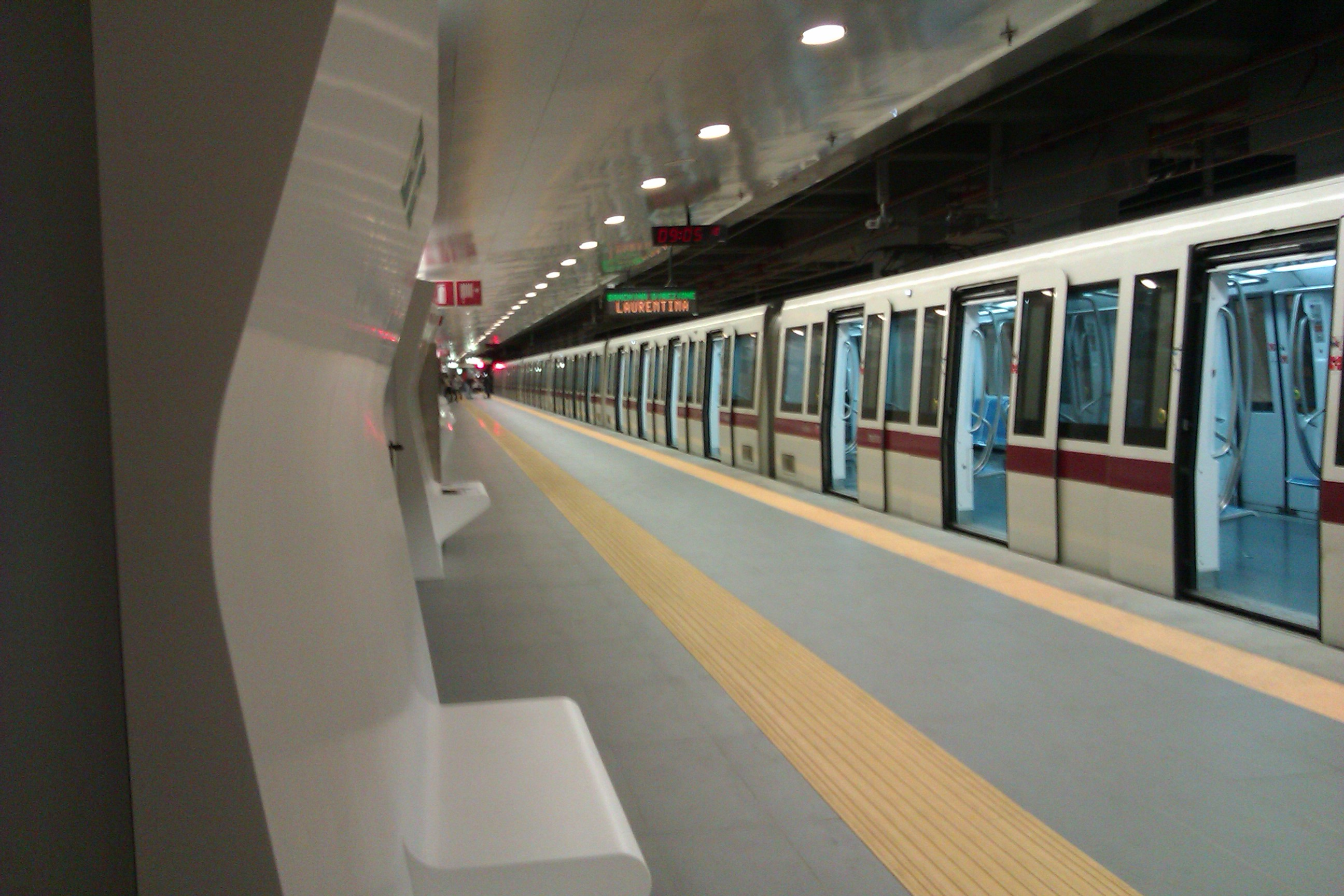
Conca d'Oro metro station

A three-line metro system called the Metropolitana operates in Rome. Construction on the first branch started in the 1930s. The line had been planned to quickly connect the main railway station with the newly planned E42 area in the southern suburbs, where the 1942 World Fair was supposed to be held. The event never took place because of war, but the area was later partly redesigned and renamed Esposizione Universale Roma in the 1950s to serve as a modern business district. The line was finally opened in 1955, and it is now the south part of the B Line.

The A line opened in 1980 from Ottaviano to Anagnina stations, later extended in stages (1999–2000) to Battistini. In the 1990s, an extension of the B line was opened from Termini to Rebibbia. The A and B lines intersect at Roma Termini station. A new branch of the B line (B1) opened on 13 June 2012 after an estimated building cost of €500 million. B1 connects to line B at Piazza Bologna and has four stations over a distance of 3.9 km (2 mi).

A third line, the C line, is under construction with an estimated cost of €3 billion and will have 30 stations over a distance of 25.5 km (16 mi). It will partly replace the existing Termini-Pantano rail line. It will feature full automated, driverless trains. The first section with 15 stations connecting Pantano with the quarter of Centocelle in the eastern part of the city, opened on 9 November 2014. The end of the work was scheduled in 2015, but archaeological findings often delay underground construction work.

A fourth line, D line, is also planned. It will have 22 stations over a distance of 20 km (12 mi). The first section was projected to open in 2015 and the final sections before 2035, but due to the city's financial crisis, the project has been put on hold.

Above-ground public transport in Rome is made up of a bus, tram and urban train network (FR lines). The bus network has in excess of 350 bus lines and over eight thousand bus stops, whereas the more-limited tram system has 39 km (24 mi) of track and 192 stops. There are also trolleybuses.

== See also ==
- Outline of Rome
- SPQR
- Tourism in Italy

== Bibliography ==
- Bertarelli, Luigi Vittorio (1925). Guida d'Italia (in Italian). Vol. IV. Milano: CTI. OCLC 552570307.
- Brilliant, Richard (2006). Roman Art. An American's View. Rome: Di Renzo Editore. ISBN 978-88-8323-085-1.
- Coarelli, Filippo (1984). Guida archeologica di Roma (in Italian). Milano: Arnoldo Mondadori Editore.
- De Muro, Pasquale; Monni, Salvatore; Tridico, Pasquale (2011). "Knowledge-Based Economy and Social Exclusion: Shadow and Light in the Roman Socio-Economic Model". International Journal of Urban and Regional Research. 35 (6): 1212–1238. doi:10.1111/j.1468-2427.2010.00993.x. ISSN 0309-1317.
- Rome – Eyewitness Travel. DK. 2006. ISBN 978-1-4053-1090-1.
- Hughes, Robert (2011). Rome. Weidenfeld & Nicolson.
- Kinder, Hermann; Hilgemann, Werner (1964). Dtv-Atlas zur Weltgeschichte (in German). Vol. 1. Dtv. OCLC 887765673.
- Lucentini, Mario (2002). La Grande Guida di Roma (in Italian). Rome: Newton & Compton Editori. ISBN 978-88-8289-053-7.
- Rendina, Mario (2007). Roma ieri, oggi, domani (in Italian). Rome: Newton & Compton Editori.
- Spoto, Salvatore (1999). Roma Esoterica (in Italian). Rome: Newton & Compton Editori. ISBN 978-88-8289-265-4.

Preceded by —	Landmarks of Rome; Rome	Succeeded by Aurelian Walls
