= Edward Summers =

American community activist

Edward Summers is the Vice President for Administrative Affairs at Anaheim University and a Higher Education & Nonprofit Consultant.

== Early life ==
Summers was born in Bronx, New York. He received his bachelor's degree in political science and Masters degree in Public Administration from Marist College. He holds a M.Phil and Ph.D. in Urban and Public Policy from The New School.

== Career ==
Summers started his professional career as the Assistant to the President and Presidential Fellow of Marist College serving for more than seven years. At Marist, Summers was charged with staffing President Dennis J. Murray for internal and external events. During his tenure, Summers engaged with institutional strategy, advancing diversity and inclusion, teaching, and community development programs. He taught undergraduate political science and graduate level public administration. Summers is noted for his work on building Marist Africa program, a service learning experience to South Africa and Ghana among other accomplishments.

In 2011, Summers was selected as Chief of Staff to the President of Union College. Summers spent three years working alongside President Stephen C. Ainlay as chief deputy advancing institutional priorities. Summers also served as the Director of the Kelly Adirondack Research Center.

In 2015, Summers became the Executive Director of the Brooklyn Education Innovation Network (BE.IN), a college and university consortium focused on building collaboration among higher education, industry, and government. Summers authored an economic development study that estimated that the Brooklyn higher education sector had an estimate $3 billion impact on the local economy.

In 2017, Summers became the Chief Strategy and Planning Officer of Long Island University. Summers also served as a Fellow for the Hornstein Center for Polling, Analysis, and Policy. He implemented text message polling at the Center.

In 2019, Summers was recruited to lead the Bronx Private Industry Council (Bronx PIC). During COVID, the Bronx PIC was actively engaged in food insecurity relief. Due to the impact of COVID-19 on local economies, Summers and his team dissolved the Bronx PIC and formed The Thinkubator. Summers served as CEO and President of The Thinkubator from 2019 - 2022.

In 2025, Dr.Summers was appointed Vice President for Administrative Affairs at Anaheim University. Dr. Summers is also a Mental Health Counselor with The Thinkubator Counseling serving Florida and is an active public intellectual publishing in higher education publications such as TheEduLedger. He has been instrumental in launching The Cadence Institute for Policy and Society

== Selected Awards and honors ==
Zeta Psi 40 under 40

Marist College Young Alumnus Award

2004 - Marist College Alumni Leadership Award

== Selected Publications ==
The Economic Development of Small Cities: Two Case Studies. ISBN 978-1-4955-1004-5

Summers, Edward (2021). Innovation in the 21st Century: Developing an HBCU Strategy for Survival! In Crosby, White, Khalid, Chanay, Marcus, and Hilton, Adriel, Imagining the Future Historically Black Colleges and Universities - A Matter of Survival. Scottsdale, Arizona. Information Age Publishing.

Summers, Edward (2016). Better Together: Making of the Brooklyn Education Innovation Network (BE.IN). In Moss M., Reed T., and Brooks Hopkins, K. (eds). The Brooklyn Way: Putting Together the Pieces of a 21st Century Downtown. Brooklyn, New York: Downtown Brooklyn Partnership.

Summers, Edward (2015). Continued Growth of Educational Institutions in Downtown Became a Model for Urban Development. Brooklyn. In Moss M. (eds). Downtown New York, New York: NYU Rising: How Brooklyn Wagner Rudin Center for Transportation Policy and Management.
