= List of Marist University people =

This is a list of notable people associated with Marist University in Poughkeepsie, New York.

== Presidents ==
1. Br. Paul Ambrose Fontaine, FMS (1929–1958)
2. Dr. Linus Richard Foy (1958–1979)
3. Dennis J. Murray (1979–2016)
4. David N. Yellen (2016–2019)
5. Dennis J. Murray (2019–2021)
6. Kevin Weinman (2021–)

== Notable alumni ==
=== Academia ===
- Edward J. Cashin – historian and Professor Emeritus at Augusta University

=== Arts & entertainment ===
- Adam Ferrara '88 – actor and comedian
- Jon Gabrus '04 – comedian, television personality
- Bill O'Reilly '71 – political commentator
- Jeff Sutphen '98 – host of the game show BrainSurge on Nickelodeon

=== Business ===
- Gina Trapani '97 – founder of Lifehacker; listed among Fast Company's Most Influential Women in Technology in 2009 and 2010
- Josiah Turbak ‘19 – Timex Group, Amazon Sales United States & Canada

=== Government ===
- Eric Adams – Mayor of New York City, 18th Borough President of Brooklyn, and former New York State Senator
- Joseph Borelli – New York City Councilman, former New York State Assembly Member
- Kevin Byrne '16 – County Executive for Putnam County, NY (2023–Present) and former member of the New York State Assembly (2017-2023)
- Daniel Dromm – member of New York City Council
- Bryan Kaenrath – member of the Maine House Of Representatives
- Patrick Mara – political strategist
- Mike Martucci '08 – New York State Senator
- Howard Mills III '86 – 38th New York Superintendent of Insurance; former member of the New York State Assembly
- Paul X. Rinn '68 – Captain, United States Navy
- Raymond F. Shields Jr. MPA '00 – Adjutant General of New York

=== Journalism ===
- Ed Lowe '67 – author and journalist
- Ian O'Connor '86 – New York Times best-selling author and national sports columnist

=== Religion ===
- Thomas John McDonnell – former Roman Catholic coadjutor bishop
- Seán Sammon '70 – Superior General of the Marist Brothers order

=== Sports ===
- Terrence Fede – professional football player
- Bobby Joe Hatton '99 – professional basketball player
- Jared Jordan '07 – professional basketball player
- Adam Kemp – professional basketball player
- Chavaughn Lewis (born 1993) - basketball player for Hapoel Galil Elyon of the Israeli Basketball Premier League
- Kathy Liebert – professional poker player
- Maureen Magarity '04 - college basketball coach
- Kevin McCarthy – professional baseball player
- Jason Myers – professional football player
- Rik Smits '88 – former NBA All-Star; 2nd pick in the 1988 NBA draft
- Menelik Watson – professional football player
- Sean Stellato – football and basketball, NFL sports agent
