= Dennis Murray =

Dennis Murray may refer to:

- Dennis Murray (politician) (born 1962), member of the Ohio House of Representatives
- Dennis A. Murray (1952–2025), pastor televangelist with The Shepherd's Chapel
- Dennis J. Murray (born 1946), current president emeritus of Marist College

== See also ==
- Dennis, Murray County, Georgia, USA
- Denis Murray (disambiguation)
