= Col. Oliver Hazard Payne Estate =

Historic house in New York, United States

- U.S. National Register of Historic Places
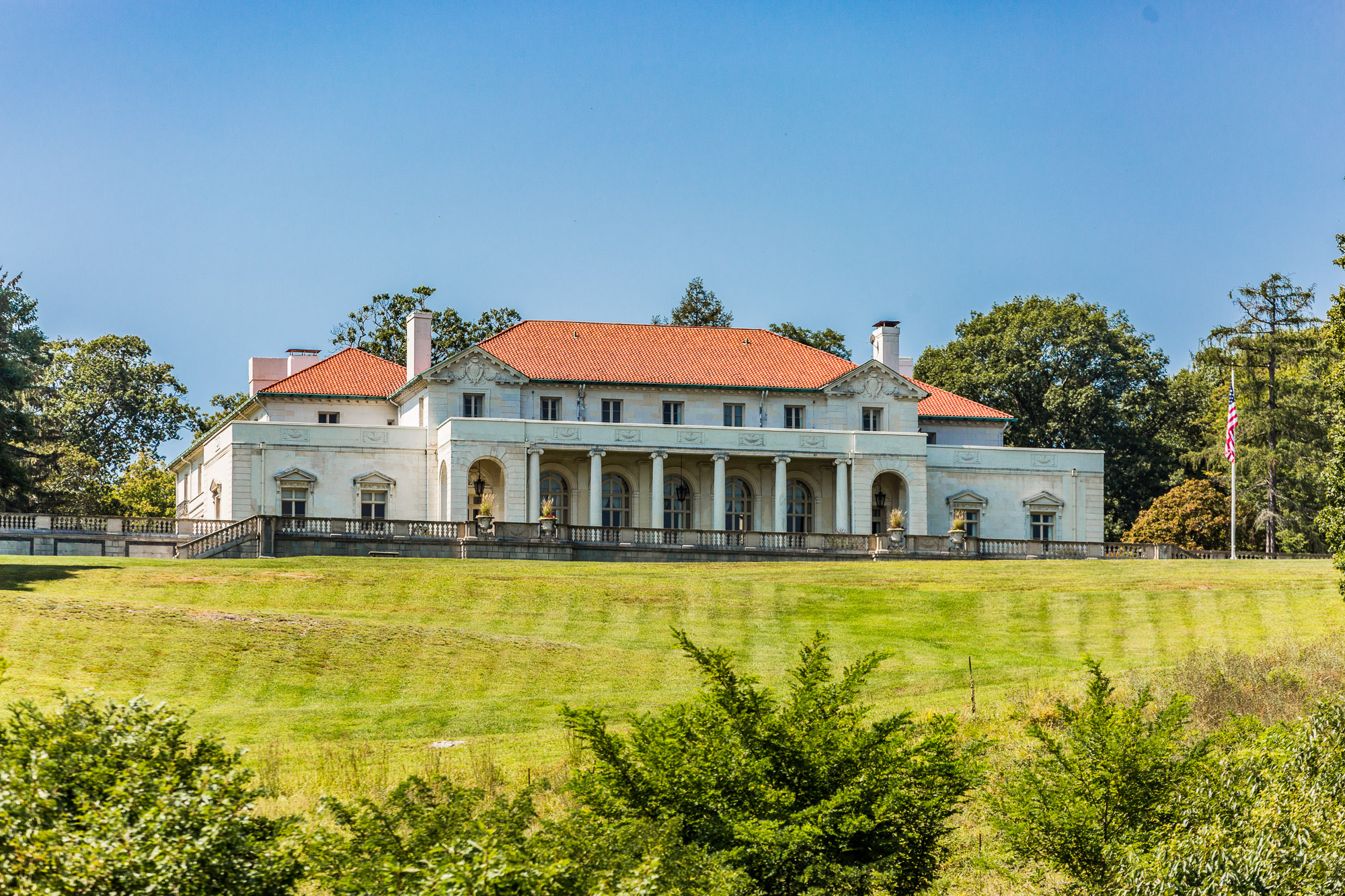

- Location within New York Location within the United States
- Location: US 9W, Esopus, New York
- Coordinates: 41°48′35″N 73°57′34″W
- Area: 60 acres (24 ha)
- Built: 1905
- Architect: Carrère and Hastings
- Architectural style: Renaissance
- NRHP reference No.: 02001324 (original); 100009323 (increase)

Significant dates
- Added to NRHP: November 15, 2002
- Boundary increase: January 19, 2024

Col. Oliver Hazard Payne Estate is a historic 60-acre (24 ha) estate, also known as Omega and Wiltwick, located on the west bank of the Hudson River at Esopus in Ulster County, New York, United States. The estate features a 42,000-square-foot (3,900 m^{2}) Beaux Arts-style Mediterranean palazzo with an open courtyard. It was designed in 1905 for Col. Oliver Hazard Payne by the architect Thomas Hastings of the firm of Carrère and Hastings, who also designed the New York Public Library and the Henry Clay Frick House. The estate is currently owned by Marist University and operated as the Raymond A. Rich Institute for Leadership Development.

== History of the estate ==
Col. Oliver Hazard Payne (1839–1917) began construction on the mansion in 1909, and it was finished in 1911. The mansion was built on the same site as "Waldorf", John Jacob Astor III’s (1822–1890) somewhat less grand Renaissance-style residence that was razed. Payne had served as a colonel in the American Civil War, and he later became involved in the oil and steel industries, becoming an investor in Standard Oil. By the early 20th century, he was Standard Oil's largest stockholder.

As Payne never married nor had children, upon his death in 1917, the house passed to one of his nephews, Harry Payne Bingham (1887–1955). In 1933, Bingham donated the 484-acre estate to the Episcopal Diocese of New York, which established the Wiltwyck School for Boys, serving troubled children from 1937 until 1966. The school's leaders included Eleanor Roosevelt, and its alumni included boxing champion Floyd Patterson.

In 1942, 60 acres of the estate, including the mansion, was purchased by the Marist Brothers, founders of Marist College, and it was used as a retreat for several years.

In 1986, the estate was purchased from the Marist Brothers by Raymond A. Rich (1912–2009), a wealthy businessman and industrialist who served as CEO of U.S. Filters Corp. during the 1970s. Following the purchase, he restored the mansion to its former glory and resided there until his death in June 2009.

In 2009, after the death of Rich, it was revealed that he had bequeathed the estate to Marist College, located on the east bank of the Hudson River in Poughkeepsie, New York. The estate was conservatively estimated to be worth $65 million at the time. Additionally, Rich set aside $10 million for the school to establish a leadership institute. This brings the estate full circle, following its prior ownership by the Marist Brothers. The estate has since been part of the Raymond A. Rich Leadership Institute at Marist, and the mansion is used for speakers, conferences and workshops by the school.

== Mansion ==
The 1909 mansion, completed in 1911, is constructed of reinforced concrete and faced with Italian limestone topped by red tile clad hipped roofs. The eastern portico has six single-story Ionic columns set between rugged arched pavilions and is fronted by a balustraded terrace overlooking the river. At the palazzo's center is an enclosed courtyard fitted with a fountain and recessed loggias adorned with frescoes.

Located nearby on the riverbank is a stone boat house that is part of the estate. The boathouse, built soon after the palazzo, is a rare survivor of its type on the river. It is neither Italian Renaissance nor rustic, but somewhere between the two.

The estate is considered one of the most architecturally significant houses in the Hudson Valley, and it was listed on the National Register of Historic Places in 2002.

== See also ==
- National Register of Historic Places listings in Ulster County, New York
