= Harry Payne Bingham =

American financier, sportsman and philanthropist

- Born: Henry Payne Bingham; December 9, 1887; Cleveland, Ohio, U.S.
- Died: March 25, 1955 (aged 67); Palm Beach, Florida, U.S.
- Resting place: Locust Valley Cemetery, Locust Valley, New York, U.S.
- Education: Taft School; Yale University
- Spouses: Harriette Gowen (m. 1912; div. 1926) Grace Lucille Momand (m. 1927; div. 1937) Melissa Williams Yuille (after 1937)
- Children: 1
- Relatives: Frances Bingham Bolton (sister); Chester Bolton (brother-in-law); Oliver H. Payne (uncle); Nathan P. Payne (uncle); William Collins Whitney (uncle); Henry B. Payne (grandfather)

Henry Payne Bingham (December 9, 1887 – March 25, 1955) was an American financier, sportsman, art patron and philanthropist. He funded a series of expeditions to study marine life.

== Early life ==
He was born in 1887 to Charles William Bingham (1846–1929), a wealthy Cleveland industrialist, and Mary (née Payne) Bingham (1854–1898). His siblings included Oliver Perry Bingham; William H. Bingham; Elizabeth Beardsley Bingham, who married Dudley Stuart Blossom; and Frances Payne Bingham, a U.S. Representative from 1940 to 1969 who married fellow Representative Chester Bolton.

His paternal grandparents were William Bingham and Elizabeth (née Beardsley) Bingham. His maternal grandparents were Henry B. Payne, a U.S. Senator from Ohio, and Mary (née Perry) Payne. His mother's siblings included Nathan P. Payne, the mayor of Cleveland; Flora Payne, who married Secretary of the Navy William Collins Whitney; Howard Payne, the namesake of Howard Payne University; and Oliver H. Payne, a Standard Oil executive who died in 1917 without children, leaving several million dollars and his Esopus estate in the Hudson River Valley known as "Omega" to Bingham, his nephew.

Bingham prepared at the Taft School in Watertown, Connecticut, and graduated from Yale University in 1910 where he was a classmate and roommate of Robert A. Taft, the son of President William Howard Taft who was later a U.S. Senator. The Taft School was run by Horace Dutton Taft, brother of the President and uncle of his roommate.

== Career ==
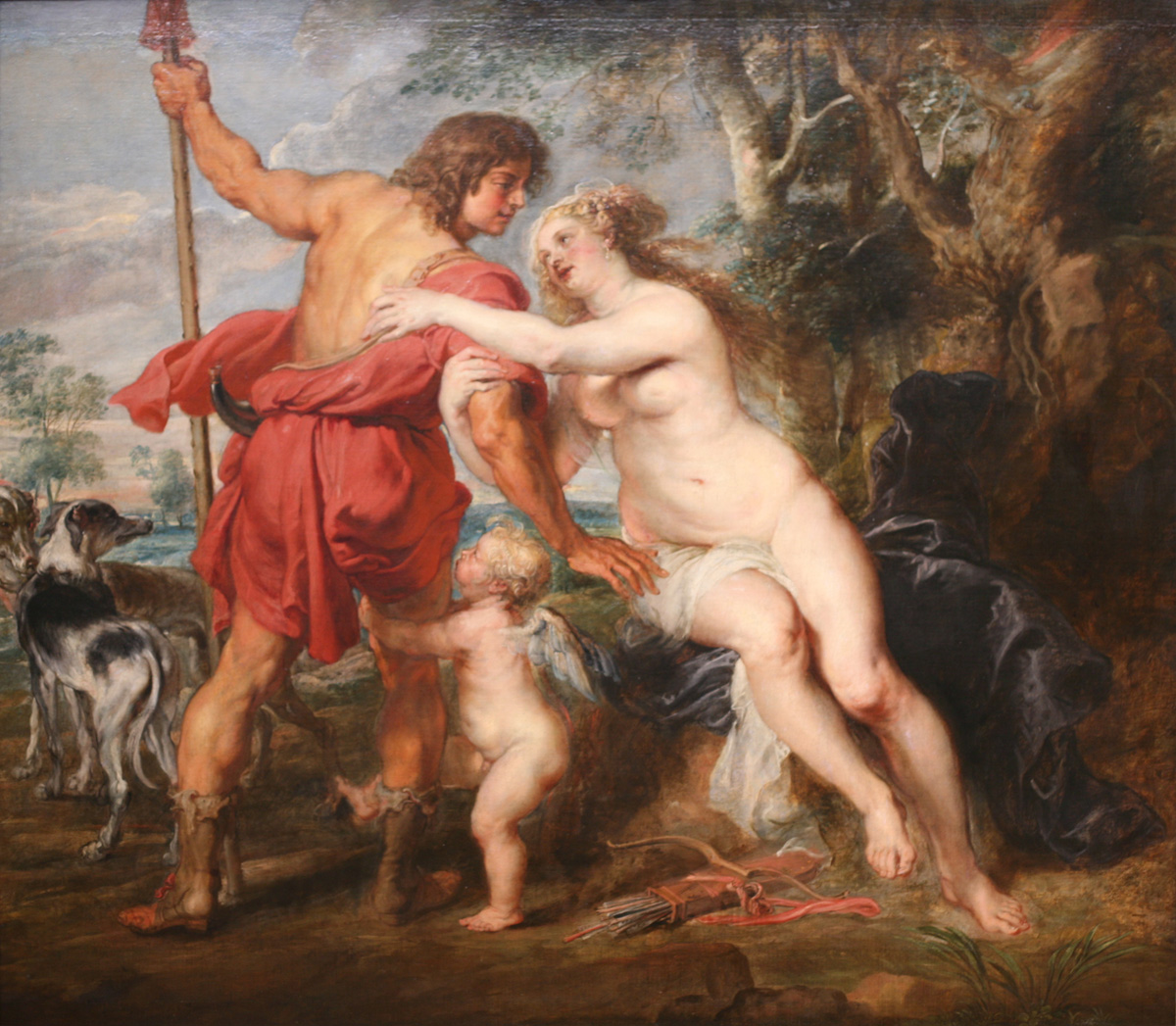
Venus and Adonis, donated by Bingham to the Metropolitan Museum of Art in 1928

Bingham, a financier, owned a seat on the New York Stock Exchange, which he sold in the fall of 1924.

He served as a director of the First National Bank of New York and of the Northern Finance Corporation of New York. In 1937, he joined the board of trustees of the Metropolitan Museum of Art along with Vanderbilt Webb and Arnold Whitridge. Later, he served as vice-president and donated to the Museum, including Peter Paul Rubens's Venus and Adonis, which he gave in 1928. In 1933, he gave "Omega", the 645 acre estate he inherited from his uncle to the Protestant Episcopal Diocese of New York. He was also a trustee of American Museum of Natural History and the New York Zoological Society.

During World War I, Bingham was a captain in the Field Artillery and served at the front for one year. He was also an amateur golfer, winning the golf championship of Long Island in 1924.

=== Explorations ===
In the 1920s he led a series of expeditions on his private yacht, the "Pawnee", that included biologist Albert Eide Parr and natural history illustrator Wilfrid Swancourt Bronson brought specimens and illustrations of marine life, donating them to the collections of the Smithsonian Institution and the Peabody Museum of Natural History at Yale University.

== Personal life ==
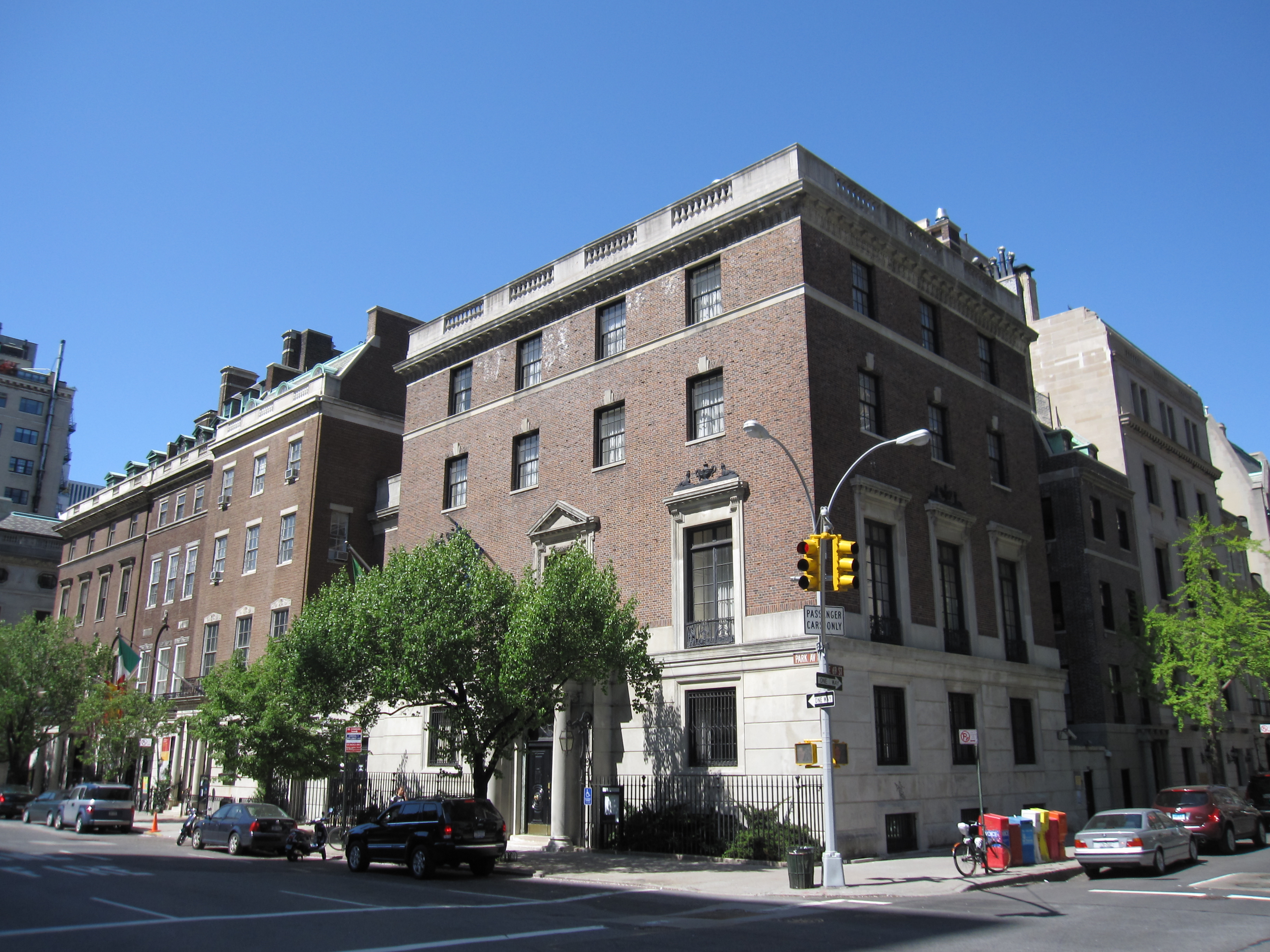
690 Park Avenue, Bingham's New York City home in 1937.

Bingham, who was married three times, lived variously in New York at 690 Park Avenue as well as 834 Fifth Avenue at the time of his death. His first marriage was on January 13, 1912, to Harriette Gowen (1892–1971) in Cleveland. Before their divorce in Paris on February 22, 1926, they were the parents of:

- Harry Payne Bingham Jr. (1912–2005) who married Lilla Fisk in 1935. (Note: Lilla was daughter of Katherine (née Kendall) Fisk (1883–1962) who was the second wife of Frederick Theodore Frelinghuysen (1886–1967), son of Theodore Frelinghuysen. After their divorce in 1955, Lilla married George C. Rand in 1956.) They divorced in 1955 and he married Marleigh Kramer Gerry, the former wife of Robert Livingston Gerry Jr.
- Barbara Bingham (1914–2008), who married Rear Admiral Edward P. Moore in 1935.
- Emery Bingham (1920–1920), who died in infancy.

On October 8, 1927, Bingham was married to Grace Lucille (née Momand) Breese (1894–1946) at the American Church in Paris. She was previously married to James Lawrence Breese, whom she divorced in July 1927. They remained married until a rather public divorce in 1937.

His third marriage was in 1937 to Melissa Williams Yuille (1898–1986), the daughter of Thomas Burks Yuille, at the home of her mother, 1040 Fifth Avenue in Manhattan. One of Melissa's sisters, Susan Burks Yuille, was married to Carroll Carstairs, and another, Nancy Yuille, was married to Richard Wyndham-Quin, 6th Earl of Dunraven. After their marriage, they lived together at 690 Park Avenue, the former home of Henry P. Davison which today houses the Consulate General of Italy. Together, they were the parents of:

- Burks Yuille Bingham (b. 1939), who married Anthony Abbot Lapham (1936–2006), the General Counsel of the CIA and son of Lewis A. Lapham, in 1964.

He was a member of the New York Yacht Club, the Racquet and Tennis Club, the Tuxedo Park Club, the Greek Club, the Hanger Club, the Knickerbocker Club, the Links Club, the Piping Rock Club, the Meadow Brook Club, the River Club, National Golf Links Club and the Metropolitan Club of Washington.

In 1930, Bingham contracted with the Pullman Company of Chicago to construct a private railcar. This was named Pawnee, and like his yacht, was a reference to the steam sloop USS Pawnee aboard which his paternal grandfather served in the American Civil War. He sold the car in 1938 and, went through a succession of owners, including the Western Union Telegraph Company which used it as a mobile communications facility. It is preserved in operating condition at the Illinois Railway Museum.

Bingham died on March 25, 1955, in Palm Beach, Florida.
