= Wilfrid S. Bronson =

American painter

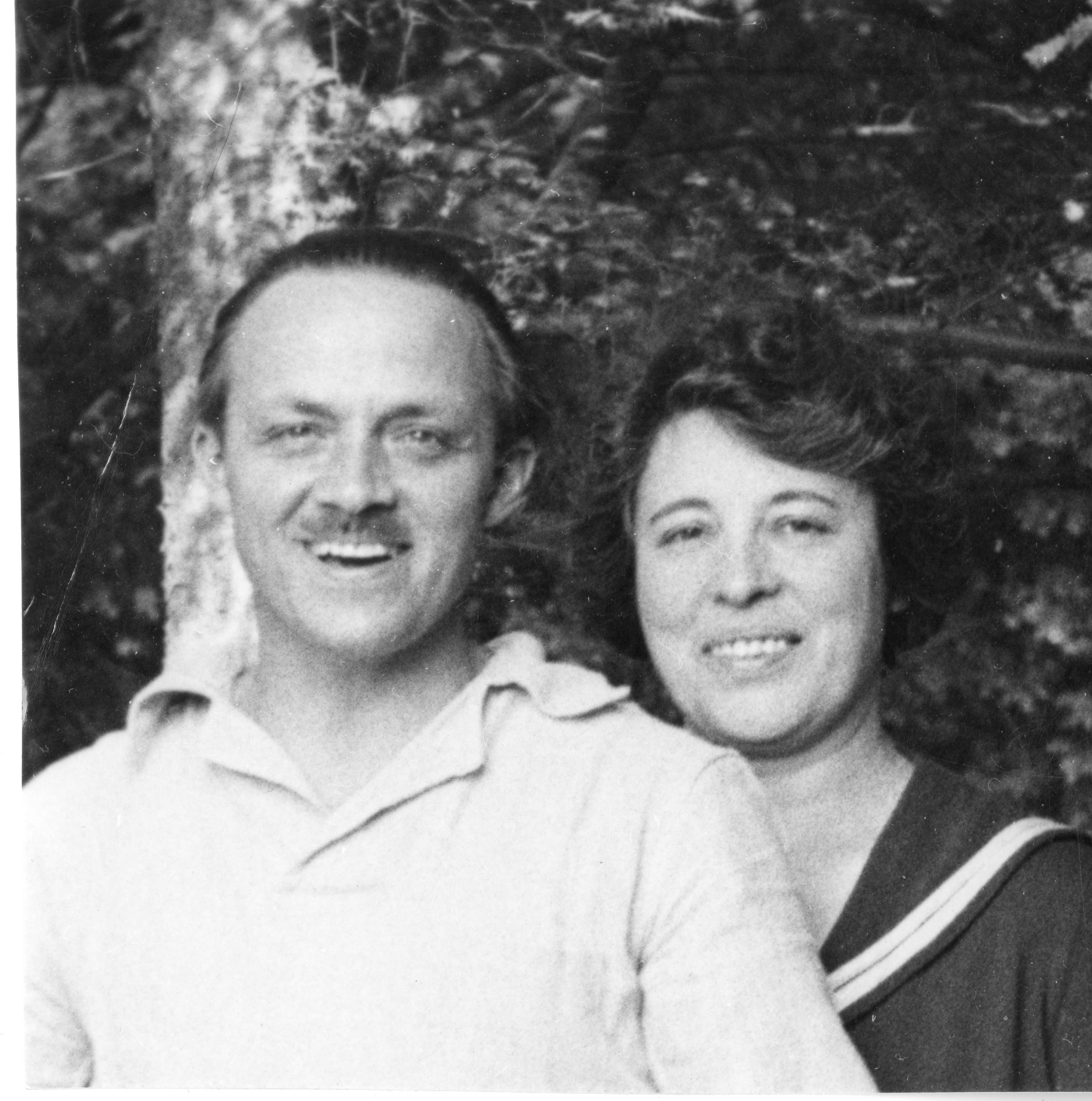
- Wilfrid S. Bronson and his wife, Sonia Joseph Bronson
- Born: Wilfrid Swancourt Branson; October 24, 1894; Chicago, Illinois
- Died: April 23, 1985 (aged 90)
- Occupation: Children's books author
- Writing career
- Years active: 1910s-1980s

Wilfrid Swancourt Bronson (October 24, 1894 – April 23, 1985) was an American natural history artist and a "prolific writer and illustrator of children's books on various aspects of animal life".

Born in Chicago, Illinois, Bronson attended the School of the Art Institute of Chicago.

Following his service in the U.S. Army during the first World War, he worked as a mural painter's assistant in several studios in New York City. In the 1930s and 40s he painted murals for the Works Progress Administration. Bronson accompanied several scientific marine expeditions as a staff artist, resulting in the creation of numerous nature books for children. In 1930 he was part of an expedition to the Galapagos to gather specimens for the Brooklyn Botanic Gardens. In the 1920s he participated in expeditions led by Harry Payne Bingham to study and bring specimens and illustrations of marine life to the Peabody Museum of Natural History at Yale University, which holds many illustrations Bronson made on shipboard to capture the color and form of marine specimens in the era before color photography.

== Books ==
- Fingerfins: The Tale of a Sargasso Fish, 1930 - "a little book of perfect accuracy and excellent illustrations, ... Every child who can read English should say, "Thank you, Mr. Bronson!" for this delightful story."
- Water People, 1936, Wise Parslow
- Children of the Sea, 1939, An enchanting tale of a dolphin and a boy with Bronson's beautiful illustrations and packed with facts from his knowledge of sea life. 164 pages, Harcourt Brace and Company
- Stooping Hawk and Stranded Whale: Sons of Liberty, 1942 - "This is an exciting story about a people who have been forgotten, but who still live free and untamed as they did four hundred years ago."
- "the Grasshopper Book", 1943, Harcourt, Brace & Co., New York
- Hooker's Holiday, 1944
- Turtles, 1945 - "Oh dear, Wilfred Bronson has done some such nice nature books and this is such a disappointment ... Here's a man who knows what can and should be done and owes it to his market to sustain a higher level of intelligent, scientific presentation."
- Coyotes, 1946 -
- Pinto's Journey 1948, Julian Messner (ISBN 0-86534-557-0) - "Good material both in pictures and story for a unit onIndians or the natural life of New Mexico. Could be used in remedial reading."
- Starlings, 1948 - "This is an engaging book that manages to put across a considerable amount of information about birds, with humor and affection throughout." "Although Starlings are the chief dramatis personae, it is a good introduction to bird life in general ... Bronson's illustrations are teaching materials in themselves and coupled with his readable style, the result is a very satisfactory book."
- Cats, 1950 - "For any household which includes a cat, Wilfred S. Bronson's Cats is indeispensable reading for the whole family. Here is another book which gains my highest recommendation."
- Freedom and Plenty: ours to save, 1953 - "An experienced illustrator and writer of non-fiction for this age group gives a splendidly organized and suggestive tally of conservation in our country."
- Beetles, 1963 - "The present book is of this same high standard, with complete information based on personal observation as well as a familiarity with the work of entomologists and presented in a tone of conversational informality. ... 40 Half-tone drawings by the author will complete a book that is high in quality all the way."
- Dogs: Best Breeds for Young People, 1969 - "Better titled and more clearly organized, it might be the canine Dr. Spock; as is, its common sense is submerged (and for some people may be spoiled by the rather coarse cartoons)."

== Sources ==
- Wilfrid S. Bronson papers, University of Minnesota Libraries Children's Literature Research Collections Archives & Special Collections · University of Minnesota Libraries
