= Denis Murray =

Denis Murray may refer to:

- Denis Murray (journalist) (born 1951), retired British television journalist
- Denis Murray (athlete) (1878–1944), Irish athlete

== See also ==
- Dennis Murray (disambiguation)
