= Lorenzo de' Medici School =

Italian campus of Marist University, USA

Coordinates: 43.7762°N 11.2517°E

Lorenzo de' Medici Institute
- Istituto Lorenzo de' Medici
- Type: Private
- Established: 1973
- Affiliations: Marist University
- President: Carla Guarducci
- Location: Florence, Tuscania, Italy
- Website: ldminstitute.com

The Lorenzo de' Medici Institute (Italian: Istituto Lorenzo de' Medici, LdM) is a private institution of higher education located in Florence, Italy, with a smaller campus in Tuscania. LdM has been a study abroad provider to students from all over the world since 1973, and began primarily as an Italian language institute. More than 2500 students attend LdM campuses every year. In 2006, LdM became a branch campus of Marist University, located in Poughkeepsie, New York.

LdM specializes in the arts, such as studio art, fine arts, liberal arts, and language studies. All courses are conducted in English with courses available in Italian for students who are proficient. All coursework taken at LdM allows students to earn credit towards their US and non-US degrees.

Lorenzo de' Medici also offers a wide variety of US-accredited 4-year Bachelor's Degree options at its campus in Florence, which are granted by Marist University. The LdM campus in Tuscania does not offer 4-year bachelor's degrees, but they do offer semester, summer, and academic year study abroad sessions. The main campus in Florence offers both bachelor's degrees and study abroad sessions.

== Degrees ==
Marist University, in partnership with Lorenzo de' Medici, confers the Bachelor of Arts degree with majors in Art History, Studio Arts, and English with a concentration in Theatre. There is a Bachelor of Science degree with majors in Digital Media, Conservation Studies/Restoration, and Studio Art. There is also a Bachelor of Professional Studies degree with majors in Fashion Design and Interior Design. Majors

Bachelor's Degrees

- B.A. Studio Art
- B.S. Studio Art
- B.A. Art History
- B.S. Conservation Studies
- B.S. Digital Media
- B.P.S. Fashion Design
- B.P.S. Interior Design
- B.A. Italian Language

Minors

- Art History
- Studio Art Certificate
- Certificate in Fine Arts

Master's Degree

- M.A. in Museum Studies

== Faculty ==
The faculty includes 180 full- and part-time professors from several countries. Most classes are relatively small and interactive. The language of instruction used in the majority of classes is English, while there are some course offerings in Italian.

== Incorporation and accreditation ==
LdM is registered and authorized in Italy by the Ministry of Education, University and Research (Ministero Ministero dell'Università e della Ricerca (MIUR). LdM and Marist University have partnered to have LdM function as a branch campus of Marist, which is accredited by America's Middle States Association of Colleges and Schools. Students needing US transcripts (whose home colleges are not already affiliated directly with LdM) can obtain transcripts through Marist.

== Study abroad ==
In addition to serving full-time degree-seeking students at the Florence campus, LdM hosts study abroad students on all three of its campuses from colleges across North America including: Adelphi University, Binghamton University, Bentley University, Berry College, Bryn Mawr College, Canisius College, Clemson University, College for Creative Studies, Columbia College Chicago, Illinois State University, Iowa State University, John Jay College of Criminal Justice, Keene State College, Lesley University, Manhattanville University, Marist University, Marymount University, Molloy College, Monmouth University, Monterrey Institute of Technology, New England School of Art and Design, North Carolina State University, Pace University, Suffolk University, Skidmore College, Tarleton State University, Texas Christian University, The Art Institute of Boston at Lesley University, University of Hawaii at Manoa, University of Illinois at Chicago, University of North Carolina at Chapel Hill, Michigan State University, University of Tennessee - Knoxville, University of North Carolina at Charlotte, University of the Pacific, University of Wisconsin–Oshkosh, and formerly Wells College. LdM also hosts students from colleges and universities across the world including, but not limited to: Catholic University of Daegu, Sookmyung University, Toyo Eiwa University, and Universidad Mayor.
