= Marist University =

Private university in Poughkeepsie, New York, US

Coordinates: 41°43′34″N 73°56′01″W

- Former names: Marist Normal Training School (1929–1946); Marian College (1946–1960); Marist College (1960–2025)
- Motto: Orare et Laborare (Latin)
- Motto in English: To Pray and To Work
- Type: Private university
- Established: 1929; 97 years ago
- Academic affiliations: NAICU
- Endowment: $585 million (2025)
- President: Kevin Weinman
- Faculty: 232 full-time 348 adjuncts
- Students: 6,356
- Undergraduates: 5,037
- Postgraduates: 958
- Location: Poughkeepsie, New York, United States
- Campus: Suburban, total 240 acres (0.97 km^{2}) 180 acres (73 ha), Poughkeepsie Campus 60 acres (24 ha), Payne Estate Urban 18,000 square foot (1,700 m^{2}), Manhattan Executive Center Urban 4,800 square meters (52,000 sq ft), Florence, Italy Campus, Lorenzo de' Medici School
- Colors: Red and white
- Nickname: Red Foxes
- Sporting affiliations: NCAA Division I, Metro, FCS football, Pioneer, ACHA Division II, SECHL
- Mascot: Red Fox
- Website: www.marist.edu

Marist University (formerly Marist College before 2025) is a private university in Poughkeepsie, New York, United States. Marist was founded by the Marist Brothers, a Catholic religious institute, in 1905 to prepare brothers for their vocations as educators. In 1929, Marist became accredited by the state to offer a wider range of degrees in the arts and sciences. Marist's 180-acre main campus overlooks the Hudson River. Marist has a branch campus in Florence, Italy. A member of NCAA Division I, Marist sponsors 23 collegiate sports. In 2003 the Catholic Church declared Marist a secular institution.

== History ==
=== Foundation by the Marist Brothers (1905) ===
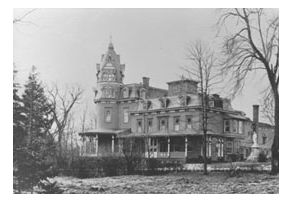
St. Ann's Hermitage, 1905

The Marist Brothers, a Catholic society founded in France by Saint Marcellin Champagnat in 1816, focused on educational work throughout the world. In 1905, members of the order arrived in the Mid-Hudson Valley to establish the first Marist house of studies in the United States. On the east bank of the Hudson River, just north of Poughkeepsie, they purchased property and a house from Thomas McPherson. They named the building and property "Saint Ann's Hermitage", in memory of Champagnat's Hermitage in France, and began training young men for a life of "study, work, prayer and service."

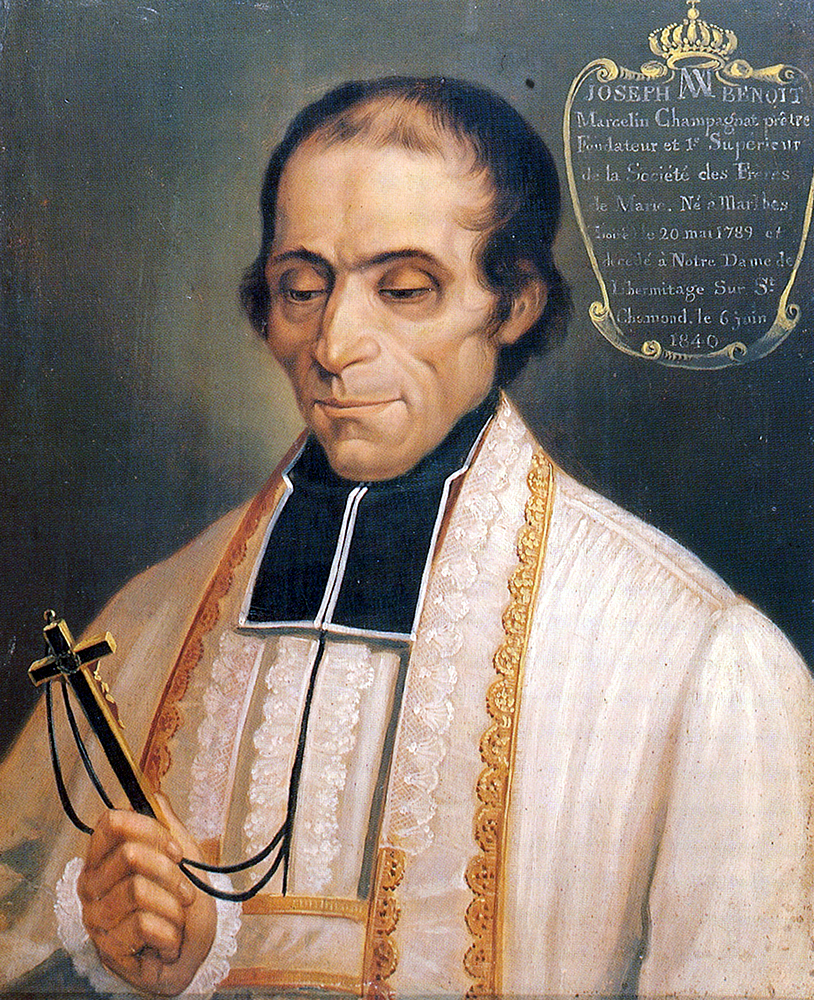
Champagnat

In 1908, the Brothers purchased the Edward Bech estate to enable the hermitage to expand, increasing the size of their property to 150 acres (0.61 km^{2}).

By 1929, the training center at the hermitage had evolved into the Marist Normal Training School, offering college-level courses under the auspices of Fordham University. The charter for the Marist Normal Training School was obtained by Leo Brouilette.

=== Four-year college (1946) ===
In 1946, the State of New York granted the institution an official four-year college charter under the name Marian College, led by Paul Ambrose Fontaine, FMS. Marian College continued the mission of training Marist Brothers as teachers of the congregation's schools.

From 1947 to 1957, the Brothers began working on the weekends, during summers, and in their spare time to build a gymnasium (the original Marian Hall), Our Lady Seat of Wisdom Chapel, Adrian Hall (which was demolished in 2001), and a residence for the student Brothers (the original Fontaine Hall).

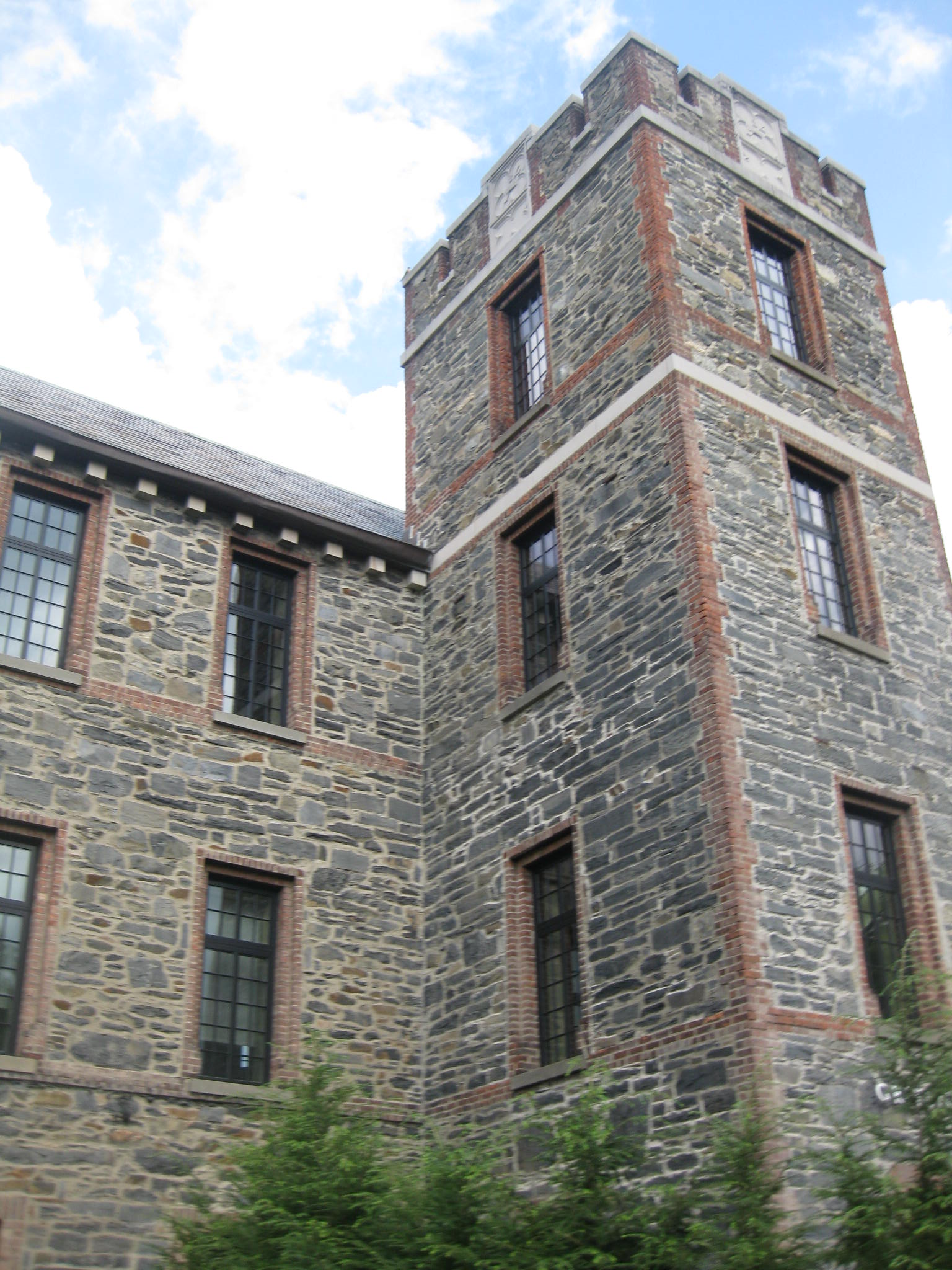
Greystone

The Marist University Library was originally housed on the top floor of Greystone in 1928. In 1945, reference, periodical and work areas took over the second floor as well, and then in 1949, the library also claimed Greystone's lowest level. The library remained in Greystone for 35 years.

In 1958, Marist Brother Linus Richard Foy took charge of the college. At 28, he was the youngest college president in the United States. Two years later, Marian College became Marist College and the mission of the college broadened to include the wider community; lay male students were admitted to pursue degree study.

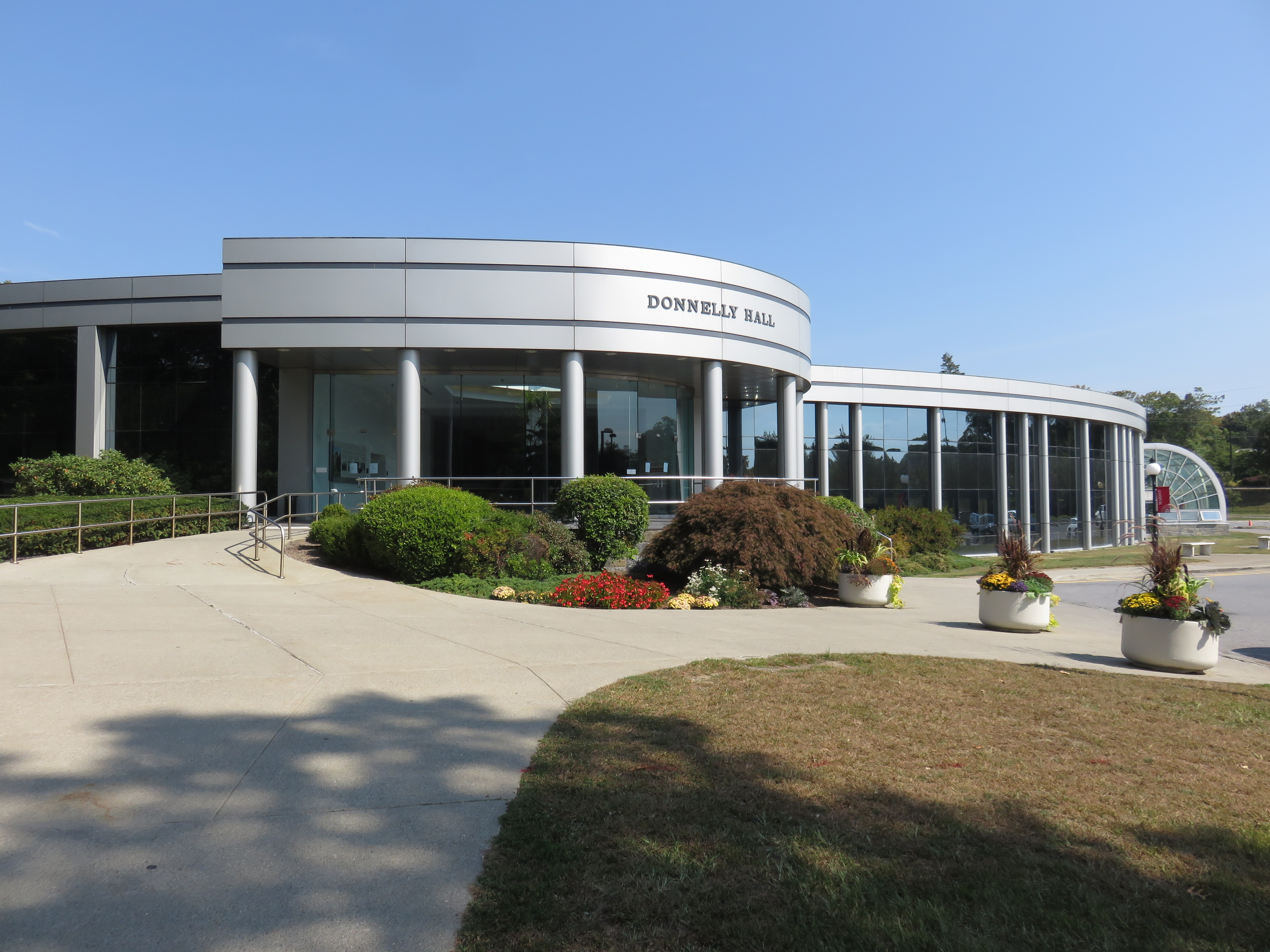
Donnelly Hall

Sheahan Hall, the first residence hall, opened in 1962. It was named for Monsignor J. F. Sheahan (pastor of St. Peter's Church, Poughkeepsie) without whom the Marist Brothers might not have been able to purchase the Bech Estate that now comprises the entire south campus area. It was quickly followed by Leo Hall in 1963 and Champagnat Hall in 1965. They were named for Leo Brouiletter (Provincial of the Marist Brothers, 1921–1930) and Saint Marcellin Champagnat respectively. Donnelly Hall (named for Nilus Donnelly, who supervised construction of the 12 major campus facilities built by the Brothers), a dormitory at the time, was built in 1962 by the brothers themselves.

Women were admitted to the evening division classes in 1966, then to the day classes in 1968. Marist's president, Linus Foy, resigned from the Marist Brothers around this time but continued serving as president. Benoit House and Gregory House were erected in 1968 as a residence for the Marist Brothers living on campus. Benoit House honored the memory of Francis Xavier Benoit who taught at Marist for nineteen years, while serving also as Director of Construction for the Marist Brothers. Gregory House was named in memory of Joseph Gregory Marchessault who was chairman of the Physics Department at Marist at the time of his death in 1969.

In 1969, due to the institution's rapid expansion and laws regulating federal aid to religiously affiliated educational institutions in New York State, ownership of the college was transferred from the Marist Brothers to the Marist College Educational Corporation with an independent, predominantly lay board of trustees.

In the 1970s, programs for the educationally disadvantaged were expanded, a computer center was added, graduate programs in business administration and community psychology were instituted, and the James J. McCann Recreation Center was completed.

In 1973, President Foy began a cooperative program with area secondary schools, in which selected high school seniors would take freshman courses and "bridge" into college. In fall 1974, the college expanded its commitment to continuing education by increasing course offerings in the evening division and summer session and in 1984, opened an off-campus extension center in Fishkill; A second extension center was opened in the Orange County town of Goshen in fall 1993.

The burgeoning library, then known as The Spellman Library, was moved from Greystone to Donnelly Hall, in the area now occupied by the Computer Center and DN256, in 1963. Space constraints required moving the library again to Fontaine Hall in 1975.

On February 18, 1975, freshman Shelley Sperling was shot and killed in the dining hall by her ex-boyfriend, Louis Acevedo.

=== Expansion (1979) ===
In 1979, Dennis J. Murray was selected to be Marist's president. Under his leadership, enrollment more than doubled and the Poughkeepsie campus expanded to its current size of 180 acres (0.73 km^{2}). Every building on campus was renovated or newly constructed and numerous strategic partnerships were formed.

One of the first strategic partnerships was formed with IBM, a major employer in the Mid-Hudson Valley. In 1984, Marist received $2.5 million in equipment and almost $2 million in software from IBM to expand academic and administrative uses of computers on campus.

One of the first construction projects was the Foy Townhouses, named after Linus Richard Foy, completed in 1982. Marian Hall was built in 1983 within and around the college's first gymnasium. It incorporates the first building to be constructed through the manual labor of the Brothers (1947). Because it is located adjacent to the spot where the Marian building (the college's principal classroom building) once stood, it carries on the name of that building as well as the original of the four-year college.

To expand student housing, Gartland Commons was built on the north end of the campus in 1985. It was an apartment community, housing approximately 300 students. It was torn down in 2015.

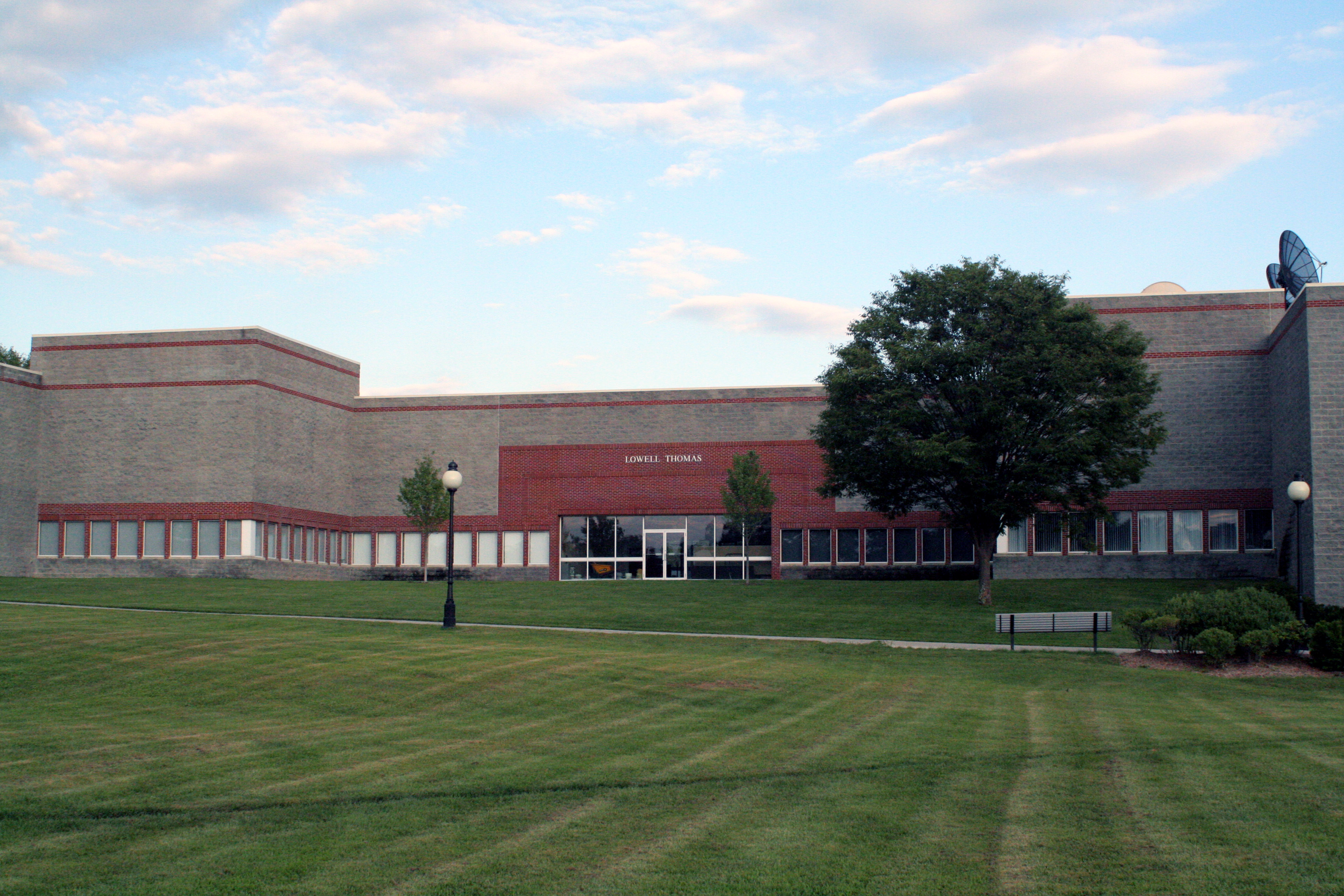
Lowell Thomas Communications Center

In 1987, the Lowell Thomas Communications Center opened, providing space for communications, math, and computer science studies. The building was built over the site of an outdoor swimming pool from the early days of Marist that was fed by a natural spring.

In 1990, the Margaret M and Charles H Dyson Center opened, providing a home for the School of Management, School of Social and Behavioral Sciences, and School of Graduate and Continuing Education.

Construction continued in 1994 with a $27 million Student Center, bookstore, dining facilities, art gallery, and a new adjoining dormitory (Midrise Hall) In 1996, Talmadge Court was purchased by the college as an official student residence.

In 1998, across neighboring U.S. Route 9, the Lower West Cedar townhouses were built and the former Poughkeepsie Steel Plant was purchased to temporarily house the library while the original Fontaine Hall was razed and a new library constructed in its place. The Poughkeepsie Steel Plant is now the home of the fine arts program and includes a 3,200-square-foot (300 m^{2}) art gallery. The Art Gallery retains the industrial look of the former steel plant with concrete floors and exposed 15-foot ceilings.

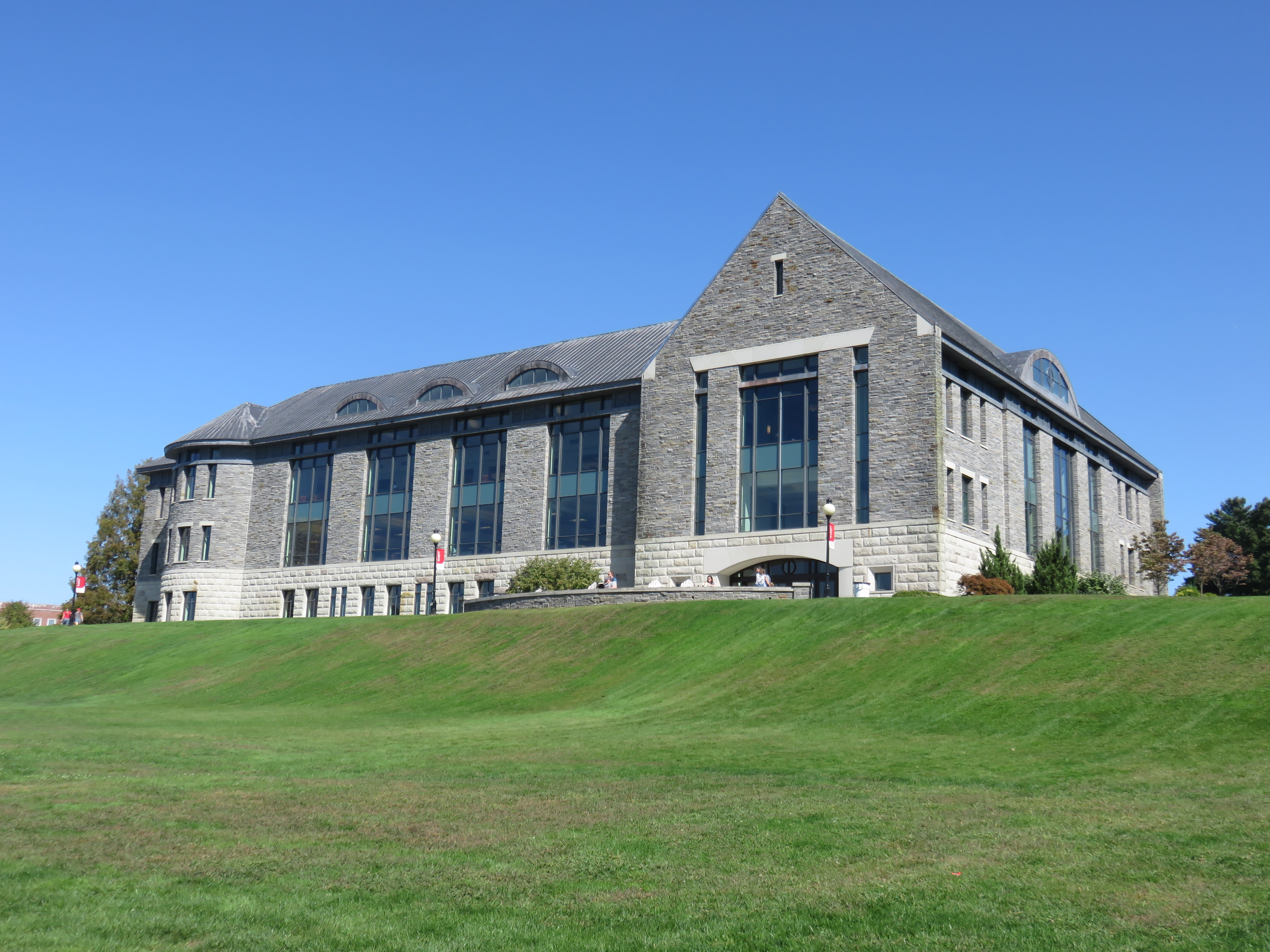
James A. Cannavino Library

Completed in 1999 and built out of fieldstone with a concentrated focus on technology, the 83,000-square-foot (7,700 m^{2}) James A. Cannavino Library is considered to be the jewel and the heart of the main campus. Architecturally, the library unifies the college's historic district of Greystone, St. Peter's, and the Kieran Gatehouse, three 1860s-era buildings that are listed on the New York State and National Register of Historic Places, which are also made of fieldstone. The library is named for James A. Cannavino, a long-time member of the Marist Board of Trustees.

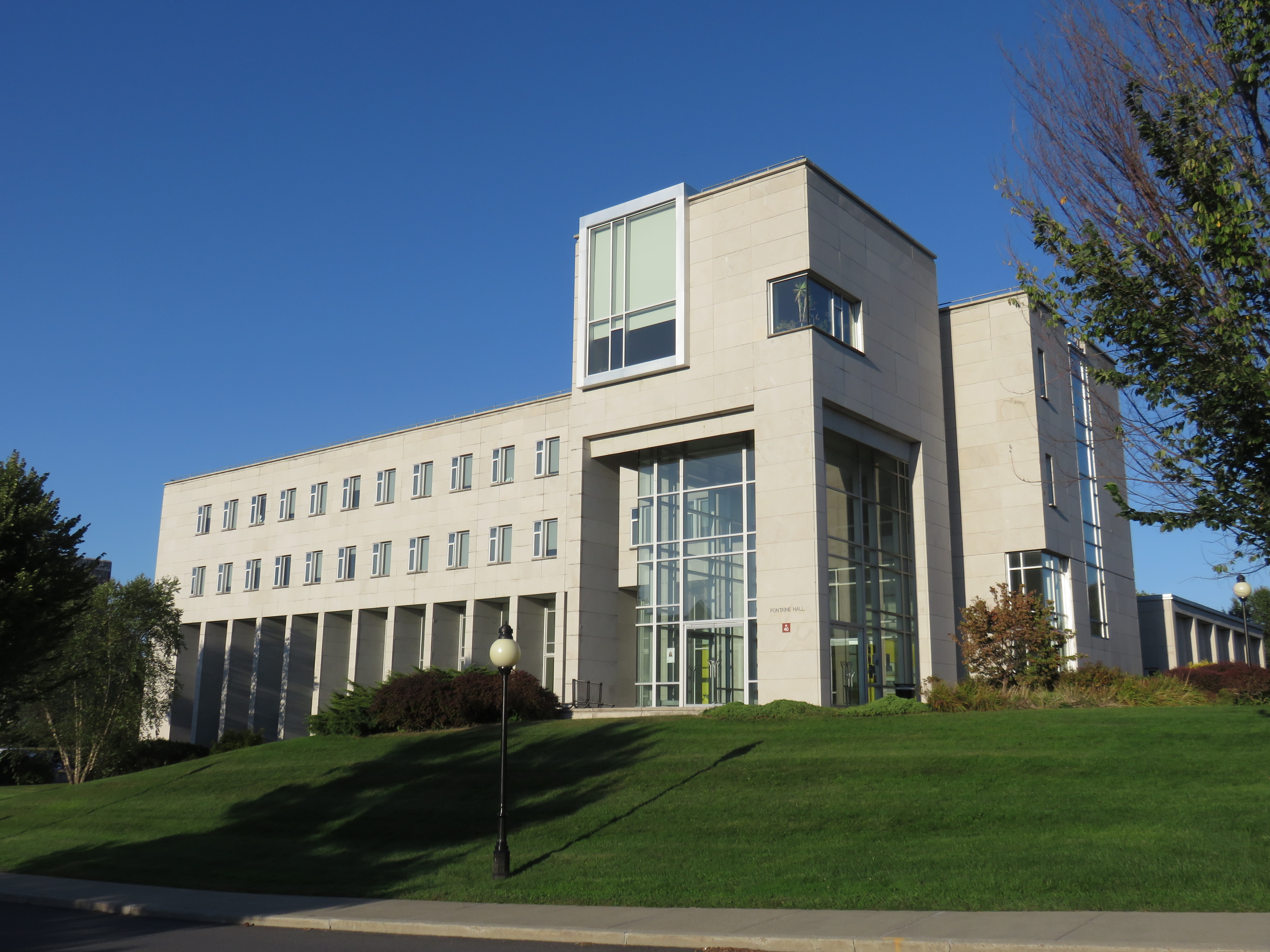
Fontaine Hall

A new Fontaine Hall was completed on the north end of campus in 2000 to replace the original building that was razed in 1998. The building holds four classrooms, a multimedia "black box" theatre and two conference rooms, including the striking Henry Hudson Room – a large conference space with skylights and a beautiful view of the Hudson. It also holds The School of Liberal Arts offices and faculty, the Office of College Advancement, which includes the offices of Public Affairs and Alumni Affairs.

With student enrollment increasing and a lack of housing for upperclassmen, the school purchased additional land across Route 9 for expansion. Upper West Cedar, built in 2000, was constructed in a similar style to the Lower West Cedar Townhouses. The Upper Fulton Townhouses followed in 2004 and then the Lower Fulton Townhouses in 2008. These housing areas are connected by a central walkway that leads to the main campus. Also, the Upper Fulton Townhouses were featured on Good Morning America in 2007 for a report on how some colleges and universities were building nicer dormitories to attract more students. The housing expansion was a sore point with the Poughkeepsie residents, who blamed the college for excessive traffic on the Route 9 corridor. The New York State Department of Transportation and Marist University both blame massively increasing population in the Mid-Hudson Valley, a result of the migration of the residents of nearby New York City starting in late 2001. In May 2007, Marist was granted a variance allowing them to build despite a moratorium on new construction in the area.

=== Full independence (2003) ===
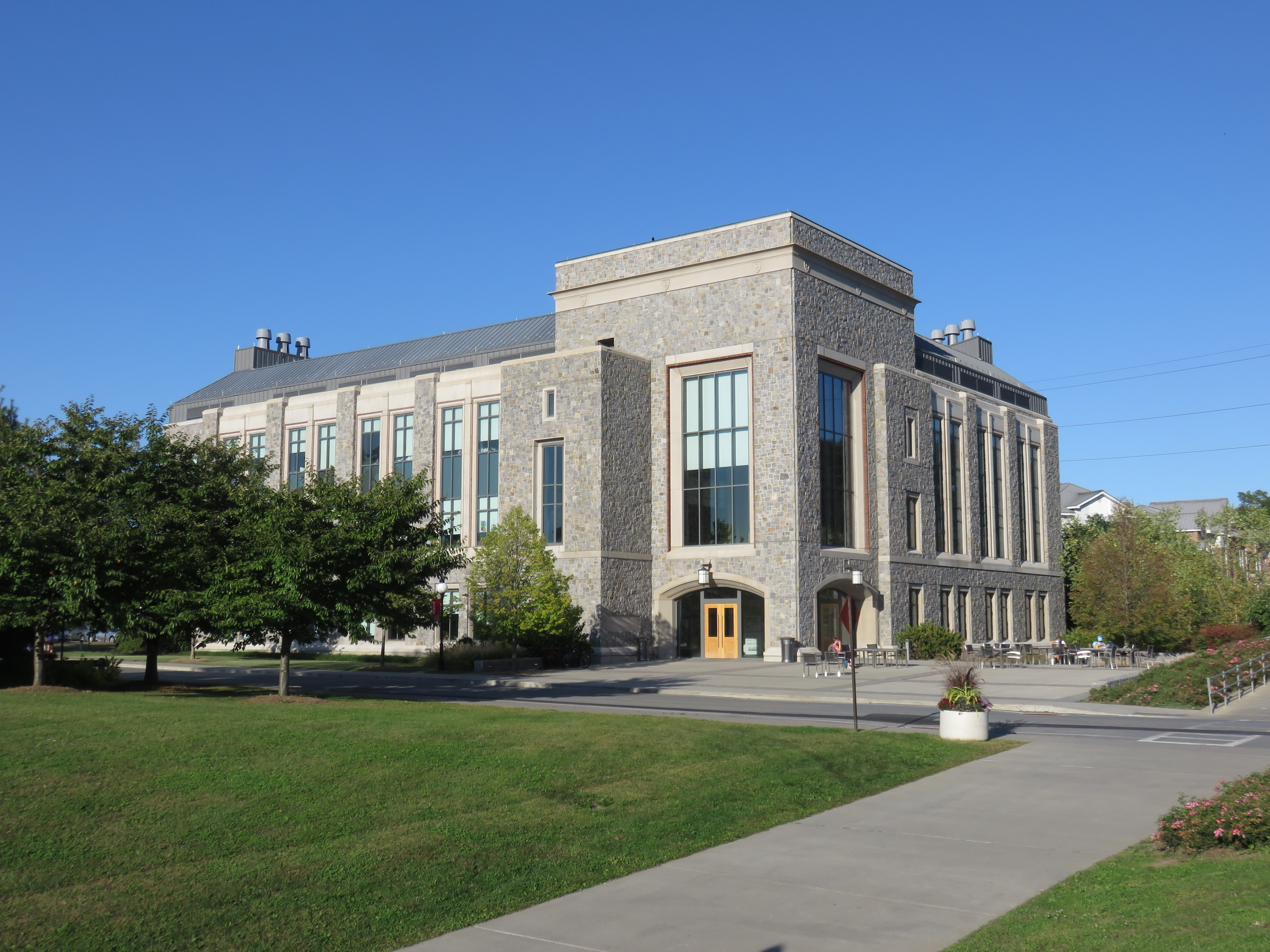
Natural Sciences & Allied Health building

Marist's independence was emphasized in 2003, when Marist invited New York State Attorney General Eliot Spitzer to deliver the commencement address for the graduating class, incurring protests due to Spitzer's public support of abortion rights. In response to complaints, then-president Murray assured the Archdiocese of New York that "Marist College is truly independent, and does not identify itself as a Catholic college in any way." (Although Marist had become independent in 1969, under Pope John Paul II's decree Ex Corde Ecclesiae, all colleges that claimed to be Catholic prior to 1991 were considered by the church to be Catholic until declared otherwise by a bishop.) Subsequently, Cardinal Edward Egan stated that Marist "is no longer a Catholic institution" and therefore not under the Church's jurisdiction.

The institution's Longview Park was completed in 2007 with a bike/walk path along the Hudson's shore, a fishing pier, the renovation of the historic Cornell boathouse, and better access to scenic vistas, particularly from the gazebo built on a promontory in the center of the park.

In September 2009 Marist was bequeathed $75 million by the industrialist Raymond A. Rich. The donation consisted of the 60-acre (240,000 m^{2}) Col. Oliver Hazard Payne Estate located in the Ulster County town of Esopus plus $10 million. The 42,000 square feet (3,900 m^{2}) mansion was designed by Carrère and Hastings, who also designed the New York Public Library Main Branch. The donation was used to establish the Raymond A. Rich Leadership Institute, which has since been focusing on teaching students the communication, interpersonal, and social skills necessary to lead complex organizations in a global setting. The gift was the twelfth largest donation in America in 2009.

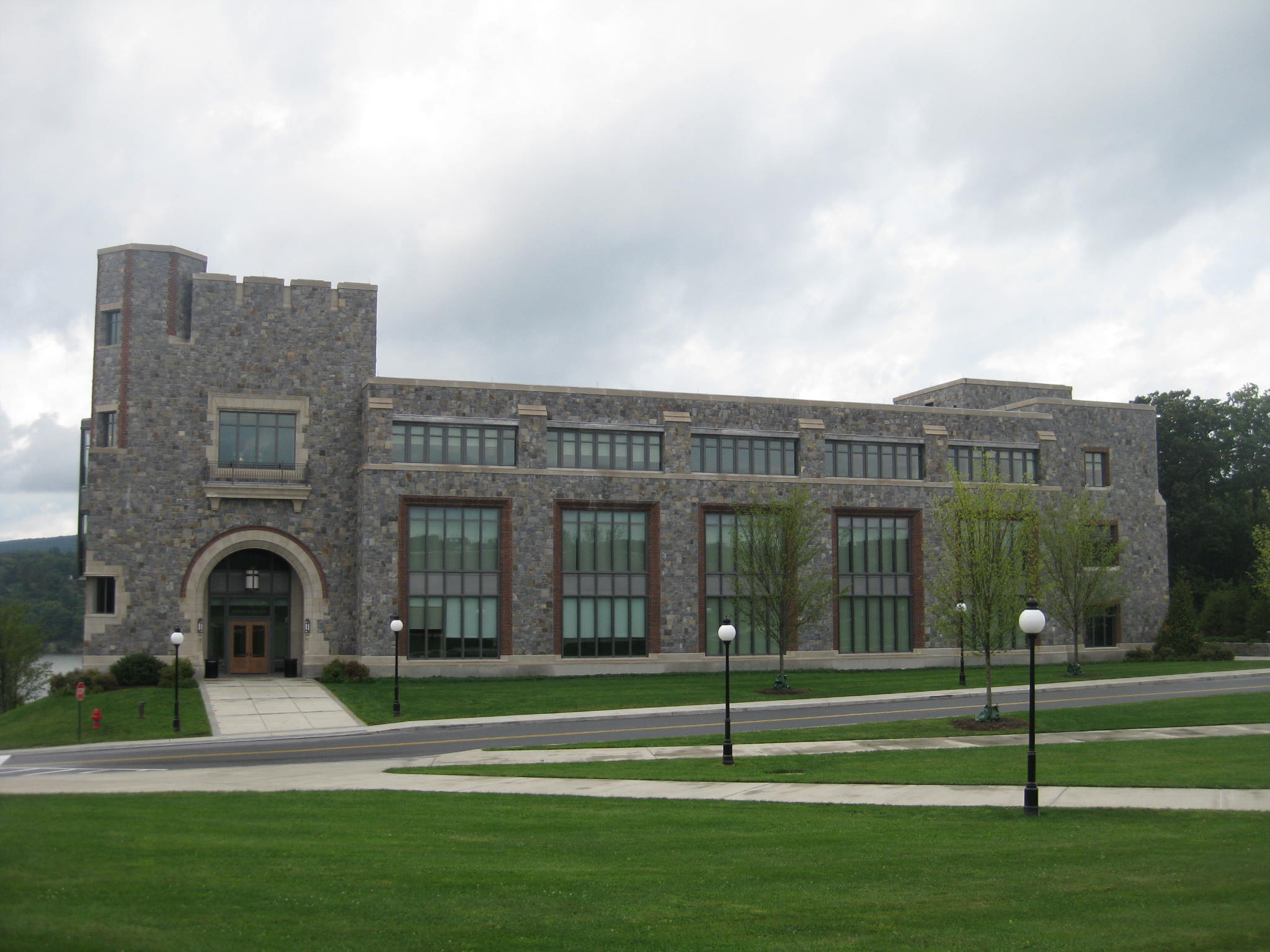
Hancock Center

In spring 2011, Marist completed construction of a new technology building, the Hancock Center, which is on the main campus where the Benoit and Gregory (residence houses) used to stand. The 57,000-square-foot (5,300 m^{2}) building is designed in a Gothic architecture style by the firm of Robert A. M. Stern. It comprises three computer labs, Marist Institute for Public Opinion, nine classrooms, six seminar rooms and a trading room for the business school.

During summer 2011, the New York State Department of Transportation completed a pedestrian underpass under US 9 to facilitate safer movement between the sections of campus, which the boulevard separates. Its construction eliminated a pedestrian-only traffic signal. In addition, one entrance near the Lowell Thomas Communication Center was closed to vehicular traffic. All three entrances were renovated and the main gate closed to vehicular traffic.

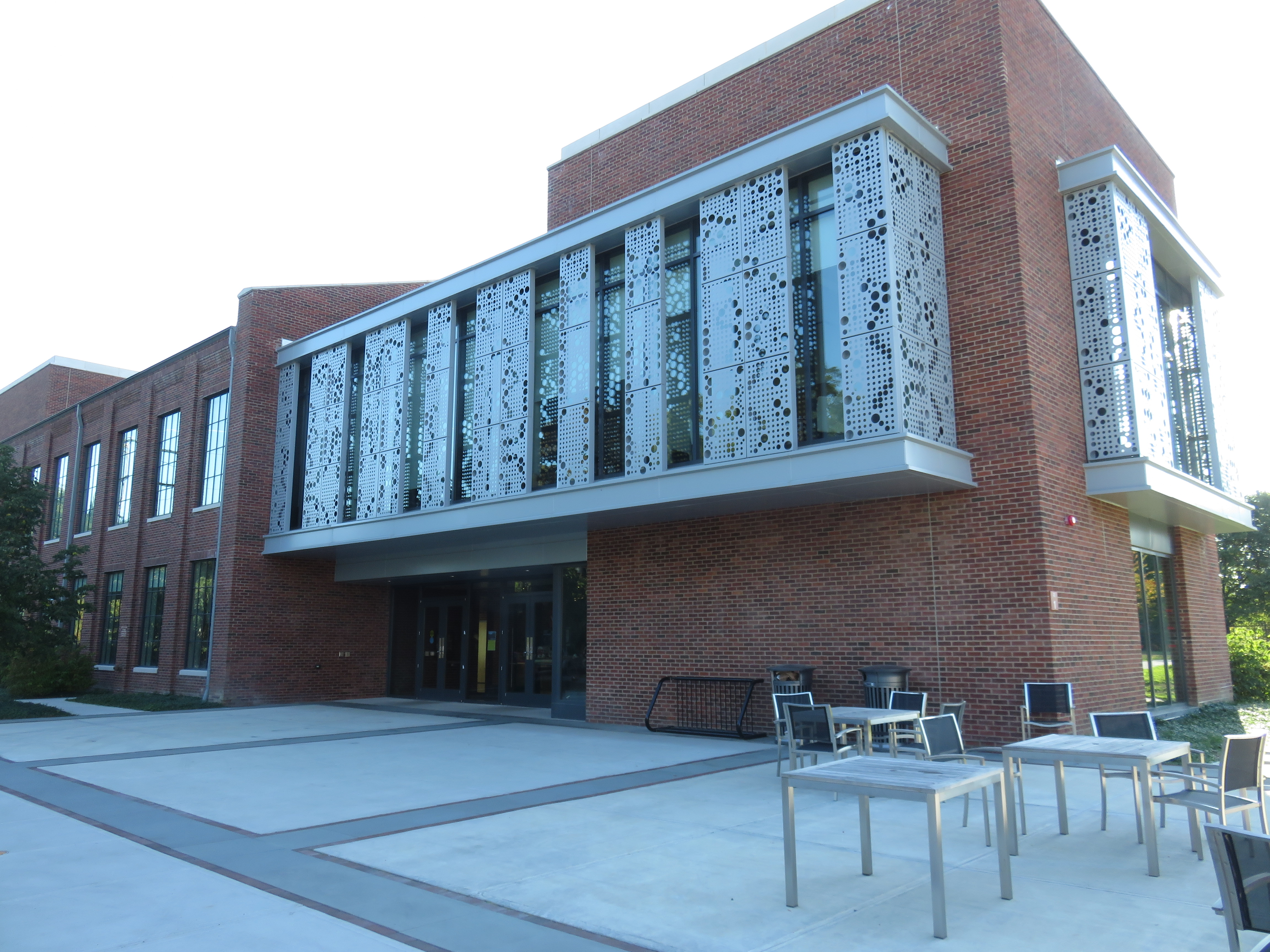
Steel Plant building

In the fall of 2013 construction of a new academic building to house the Music Department and renovations to the Lowell Thomas Communications Center, the student center and the dining hall were completed.

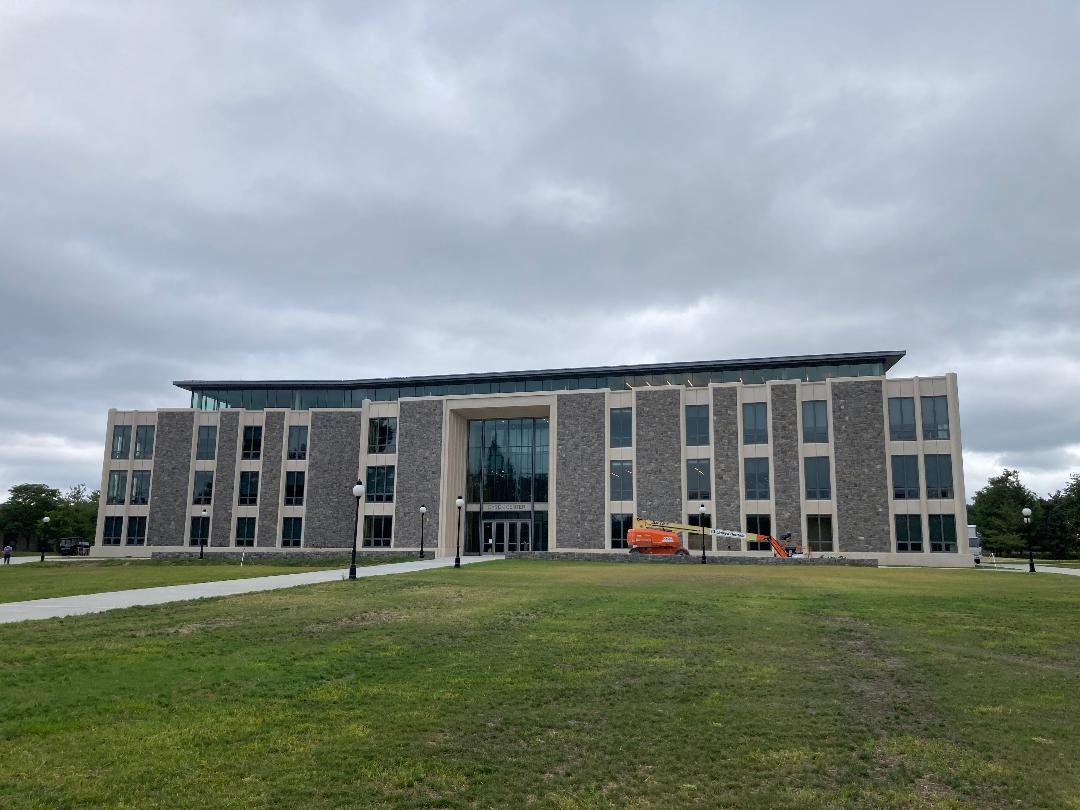
Dyson Center

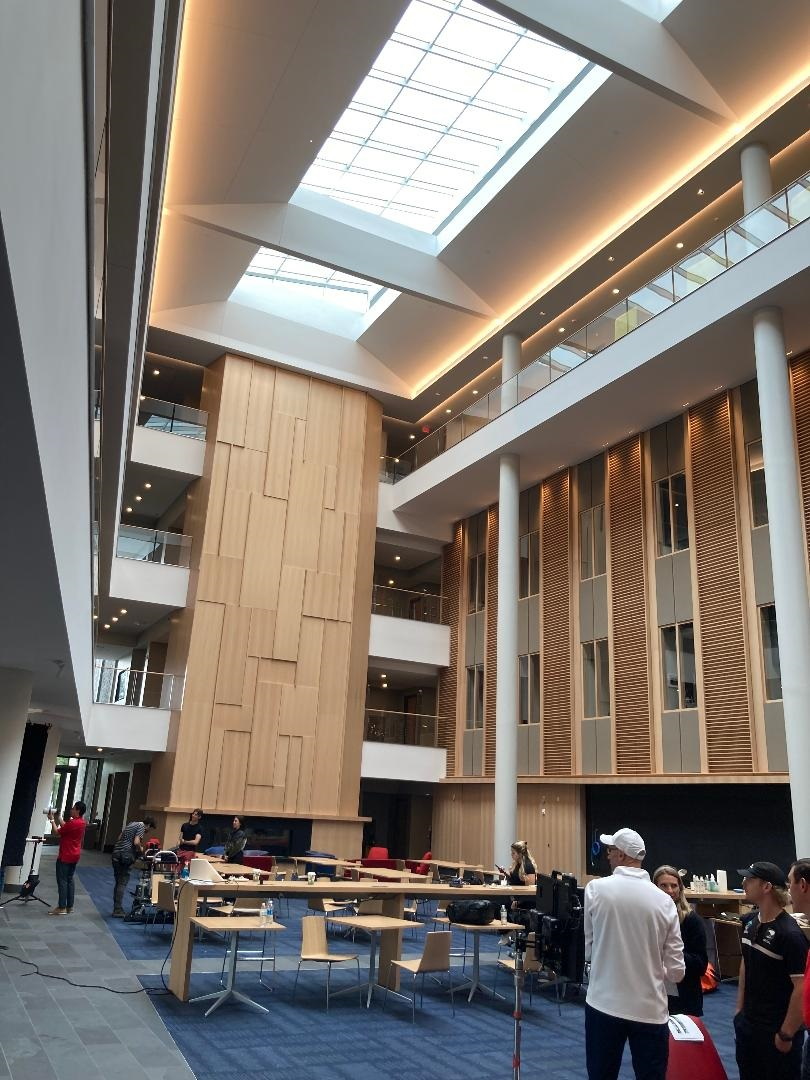
Dyson Center atrium

In September 2018 Marist announced that it will partner with Nuvance Health (formerly Health Quest) to create a medical school. Plans call for the construction of a 100,000 square foot (9,300 m^{2}) building on the Vassar Brothers Medical Center campus in the City of Poughkeepsie, which will house school administration and classroom space. The proposed school will be named the Marist Nuvance School of Medicine. Plans for the medical school have since been put on hold indefinitely.

In January 2019 a major renovation and addition to the Steel Plant was completed. The new building features the renovated original 12,000-square-foot historic industrial Steel Plant Building and a 35,000-square-foot addition housing the Fine Arts, Digital Media, and Fashion Programs.

In October 2021, Kevin Weinman became the institution's fifth president.

In August 2024, Marist completed a major renovation and addition to the Dyson Center. The new four-story, 107,000-square-foot building houses The School of Management and School of Social and Behavioral Sciences.

=== University status (2025) ===
Marist College was renamed Marist University on January 29, 2025.

== Presidents ==
1. Paul Ambrose Fontaine (1946–1958)
2. Linus Richard Foy (1958–1979)
3. Dennis J. Murray (1979–2016); interim (2019–2021)
4. David N. Yellen (2016–2019)
5. Kevin Weinman (2021–present)

== Campuses ==
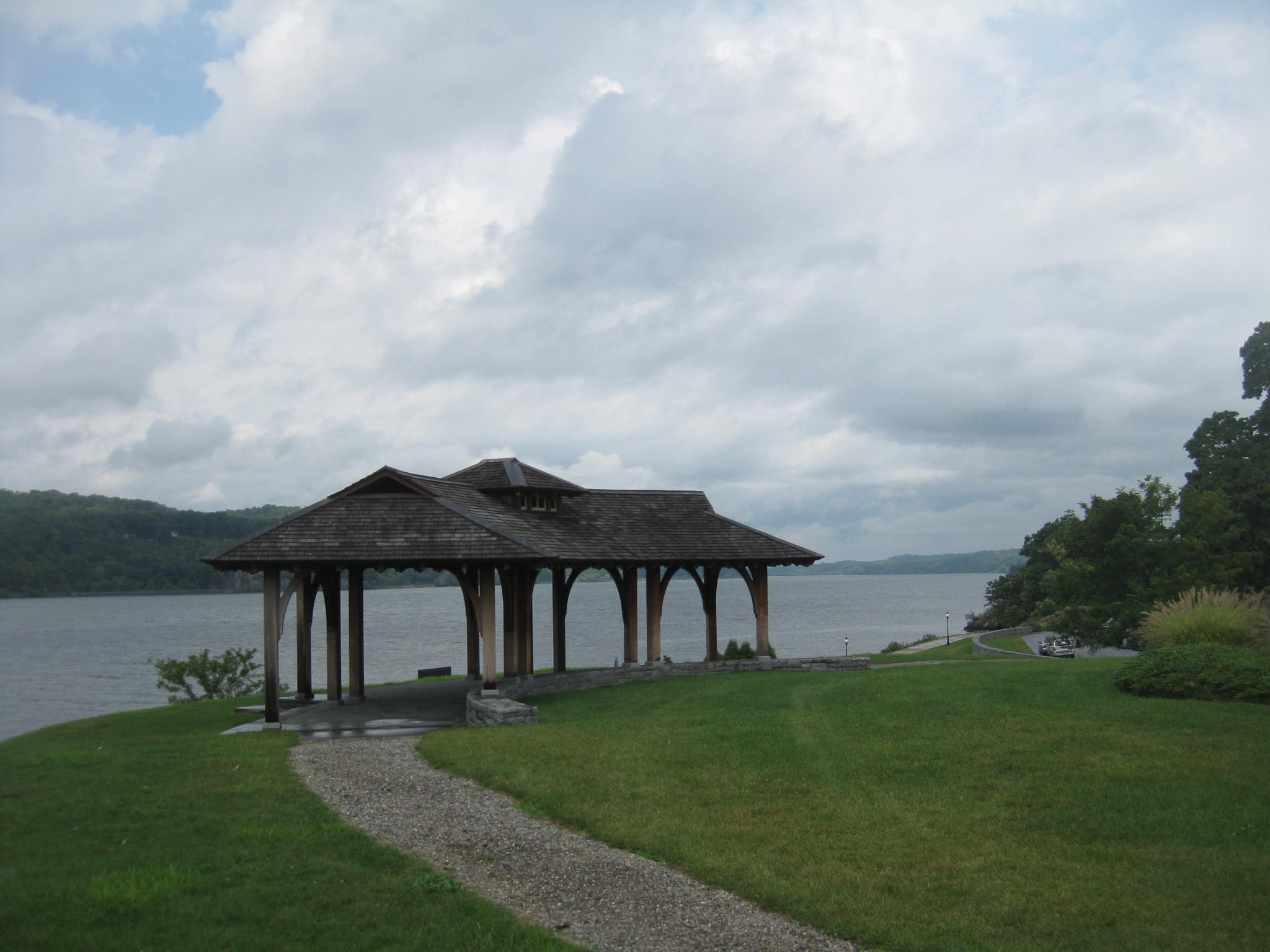
Gazebo at Longview Park

The main campus, with an area of 180 acres (0.73 km^{2}), is on the east bank of the Hudson River in the town of Poughkeepsie, New York, on US 9 in the historic Hudson Valley; it was a census-designated place in 2019. The part of the main campus east of US 9 is called the east campus. In addition to the main campus Marist owns the Payne Estate which has 60 acres (0.24 km^{2}) on the west bank of the Hudson River in the town of Esopus, in Ulster County, the 18,000 square foot (1,700 m^{2}) Marist Executive Center encompassing the 14th floor of 420 Fifth Avenue in midtown Manhattan and a branch campus in Florence Italy. In 2004, Marist announced its Campus Master Plan, which called for the development of a pedestrian-friendly campus heart, with plenty of open and inviting green spaces for interaction. The creation of this campus heart involved the connection of the east and west campuses, the continued improvement of academic and recreational spaces, the addition of green space, and the relocation of parking to the periphery. The master plan is still being implemented, but the progress to date has created what many consider one of the more beautiful campuses in the Northeastern United States.

The area around the campus first appeared as a census-designated place (CDP) in the 2020 U.S. census, with a population of 2,894. The area surrounding the part of the campus east of US Route 9 is Fairview CDP, part of Poughkeepsie.

=== Branch campus in Florence, Italy ===
The Lorenzo de' Medici School campus consists of ten buildings totaling 4,800 square meters (52,000 sq ft), in the historic San Lorenzo district of the Florence city center. The main building, situated in Via Faenza, dates back to the 13th century and originated as a convent connected to a medieval church, San Jacopo in Campo Corbolini. This church, now deconsecrated, was founded in 1206 and for its first hundred years belonged to the Knights Templar. The facilities include studio space, lecture classrooms, and design workshops. Marist offers two housing options to its students: dedicated Marist residences and apartments that are located through the city.

=== New York City Executive Center ===
The Marist Executive Center, which opened in 2019, encompasses the 14th floor of 420 Fifth Avenue in midtown Manhattan. The New York City location, 18,000 square foot (1,700 m^{2}), functions as a location for academic offerings for graduate, adult, undergraduate, and corporate programs. Additionally, it serves as a featured location for prominent events such as the Marist Fashion Program's ongoing involvement with New York Fashion Week, programs featuring the nationally recognized Marist Poll, seminars and lecture series, receptions, and alumni networking events.

Marist bought the space in 2018, put it up for sale in 2020, and now occupies the space under a lease agreement.

== Residential life ==
Marist has standard dormitory buildings for all freshman students. There are townhouse and apartment facilities for upperclassmen. Freshman housing consists of four hall-style dormitories: Marian Hall, housing 100 students; Sheahan Hall, housing 140 students; Leo Hall, housing 300 students; and Champagnat Hall, housing over 400 students. In addition, a variable number of freshmen are assigned to Midrise Hall, which holds all four years of students in suite-style dormitories. Housing is guaranteed for freshmen and sophomores, but not for juniors and seniors. There is enough housing to hold a large portion of the upperclassmen.

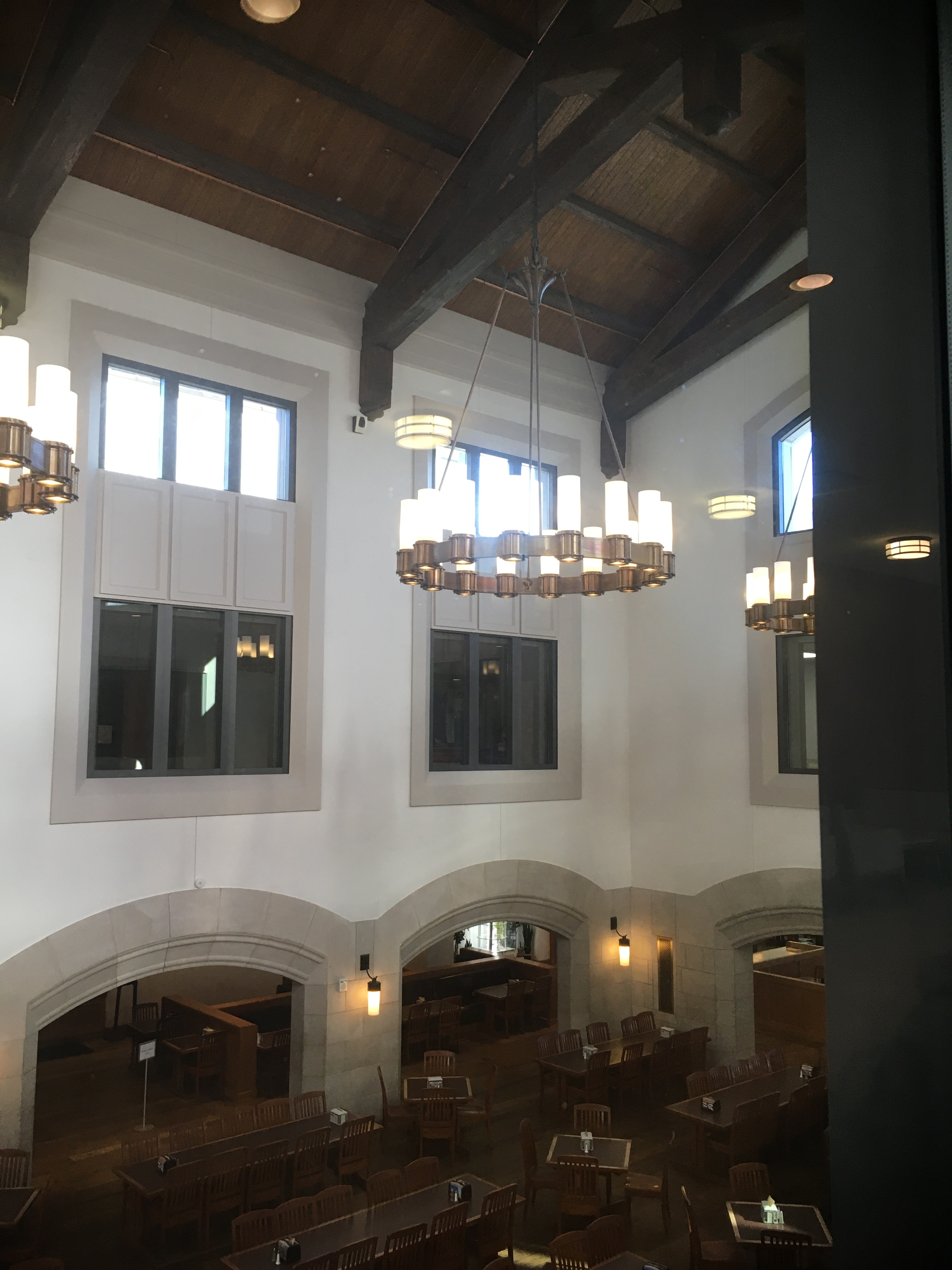
The main dining hall atrium

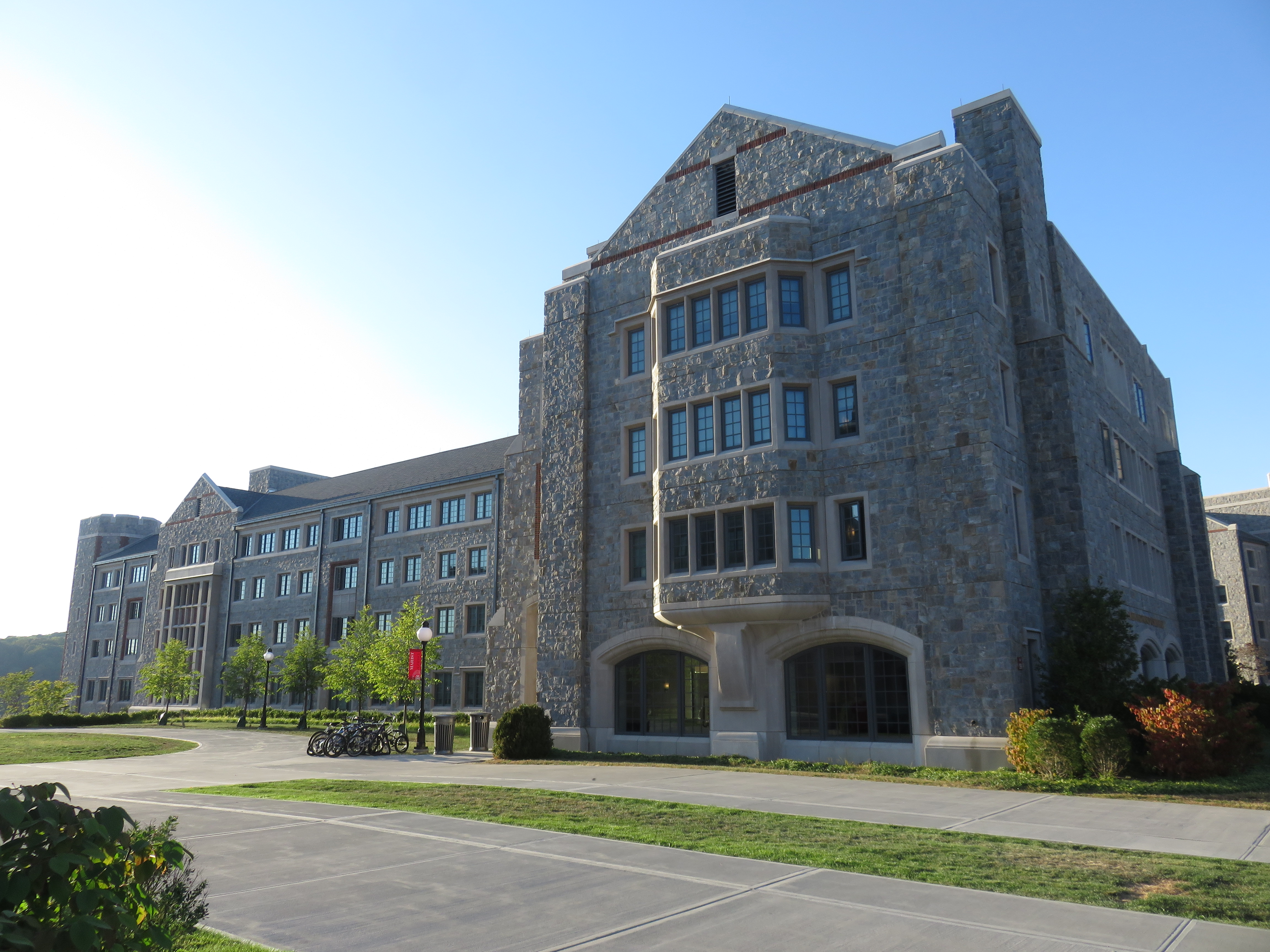
John and Nancy O'Shea Hall

All underclassmen live on the west side of Route 9, which is the main part of campus. Upperclassmen reside on the east side of Route 9, which is also considered the "wet side" of campus because the consumption of alcohol is allowed for students over the age of 21. Upperclassmen also reside in the north end residence halls on the main campus. While all incoming freshmen are assigned to a dorm, the housing for other classes is determined via a points system. Under the priority points system, students accumulate a certain number of points from clubs, sports, and grade point average. The students with the highest points are allowed to choose housing first, thus filling the nicer housing first. The students with the lower points choose last and are not always guaranteed housing. If students are entering as a group, the students' points are averaged together. According to Marist, this system promotes student activity in clubs and sports and offers an incentive to keep a high GPA.

== Academics ==
Marist University offers 47 Bachelor of Arts and Bachelor of Science degrees, 11 master's degrees, and 2 certificate programs. These programs are divided between the six undergraduate schools and the School of Global and Professional Programs. The undergraduate schools are The School of Communication and the Arts, The School of Computer Science and Mathematics, The School of Liberal Arts, The School of Management, The School of Science and The School of Social and Behavioral Sciences.

All undergraduate Marist students must take what is known as "core" classes during their four years in order to graduate. There are a number of different 3-credit core classes students can take, usually consisting of writing, history, cultural diversity, and a philosophy class. The requirements are the same for all majors and emphasize Marist's tradition of a liberal arts education while ensuring that students are introduced to a broad range of disciplines. The student-faculty ratio at Marist is 16:1, and the school has over 50 percent of its classes with fewer than 20 students. The average freshman retention rate is 88.8 percent.

Undergraduate admission to Marist is selective. The incoming 2026 freshman class had 49% of the 11,260 applicants accepted. The middle 50% of admitted students scored between 1220 and 1350 on the Math and Evidence-Based Reading and Writing sections of the SAT. The middle 50% of accepted students scored between 26 and 30 on the ACT. The middle 50% of accepted students took between 2 and 6 AP Courses.

=== Accreditations ===
Marist University is accredited by the Middle States Commission on Higher Education. Specifically accredited programs include:

- The School of Management is accredited for its Business program by the Association to Advance Collegiate Schools of Business (AACSB International).
- The Athletic Training program is accredited by the Commission on Accreditation of Athletic Training Education (CAATE).
- The Medical Technology program is accredited by the National Accrediting Agency for Clinical Laboratory Sciences (NAACLS).
- The Social Work bachelors completion program is accredited by the Council on Social Work Education (CSWE).

=== IBM partnership ===
Marist also has had a longstanding partnership with IBM. IBM tests concepts and applications in education, business and communication. The joint study began in 1988 with the installation of a $10 million IBM 3090 mainframe computer on campus. In the fall 2002 semester, the institution installed a new zSeries 900 mainframe that provided a level of computing power ordinarily associated with large research universities and Fortune 500 companies. In 2009, Marist and IBM began three research projects involving grid computing, e-learning applications, and computing on demand. In December 2011, it was announced that Marist and IBM were also working towards developing a "cloud computing" center to be housed at Marist's Hancock Center. In early 2012, the School of Computer Science and Mathematics installed two IBM z114 mainframes with a zEnterprise BladeCenter Extension (zBX), making Marist the first college or university in the world to have this combination. The project has since been named The IBM SmartCloud solution at Marist University. In October 2019, Marist installed the world's first IBM LinuxONE III, a secured enterprise platform for mission-critical applications and sensitive data for hybrid cloud.

=== Rankings ===
Academic rankings

Master's
- Washington Monthly: 240

Regional
- U.S. News & World Report: 8

National
- Forbes: 189
- WSJ/College Pulse: 398

In the 2026 edition of U.S. News & World Report's "America's Best Colleges", Marist was listed 6th in the category "Regional Universities North". Marist's acceptance rate of 45 percent made it one of the most selective schools in this category. Marist is listed as one of the top 386 colleges in the United States and one of the top 50 colleges that create futures by The Princeton Review. The U.S. Bureau of Educational and Cultural Affairs identified Marist as a 'U.S. Student Top Producer', making it one of the U.S. colleges and universities that produced the most Fulbright U.S. Students for the years 2015–2016, 2019–2020 & 2020–2021. In 2012, Marist's online MBA was one of only 14 graduate business programs in the nation named to U.S. News & World Report's honor roll. In 2019 U.S. News & World Report ranked three Marist online programs; the graduate program in business (non-MBA) #60, the Master's in Business Administration #58, in the MBA category, and the bachelor's degree program in Professional Studies #49. Also in 2019, Business of Fashion ranked the Marist Fashion Program among the top global Fashion Schools for both undergraduate fashion design and fashion business and management and the 22nd overall globally. In 2021 Forbes ranked Marist as one of the top 10 colleges in the world that are shaping the future of fashion. For over a decade Kiplinger's Personal Finance has included Marist on its list of the country's 'Best Values in Private Colleges'.

=== International links ===
In 2006, Marist partnered with Lorenzo de' Medici School to form a branch campus in Florence, Italy. There, students can study for a semester or academic year and choose from over 400 different classes. Additionally, there are bachelor's degree programs for those who wish to pursue a four-year degree. Degrees are offered in art history, conservation studies/restoration, digital media, interior design, fashion design, studio art (both B.A. and B.S.).

Marist students also have access to the Hansard Scholars Programme in London, England. Student scholars live in London and study at the London School of Economics while interning at the British Parliament or another politically based organization.

Marist was recognized as among the nation's leading colleges and universities for international education, according to the 2021 Open Doors Report from the Institute of International Education.

== Centers and institutes ==
Marist is home to the Marist Institute of Public Opinion (MIPO), a polling organization who operates Marist Poll and is active in the political arena; the Hudson River Valley Institute (HRVI), the educational arm of the Hudson River Valley National Heritage Area; and the Center for Applied Research in Collaborative and On-Demand Computing (CCODC). HRVI oversees the publication of the Hudson River Valley Review, a journal of regional studies.

== Student organizations and events ==
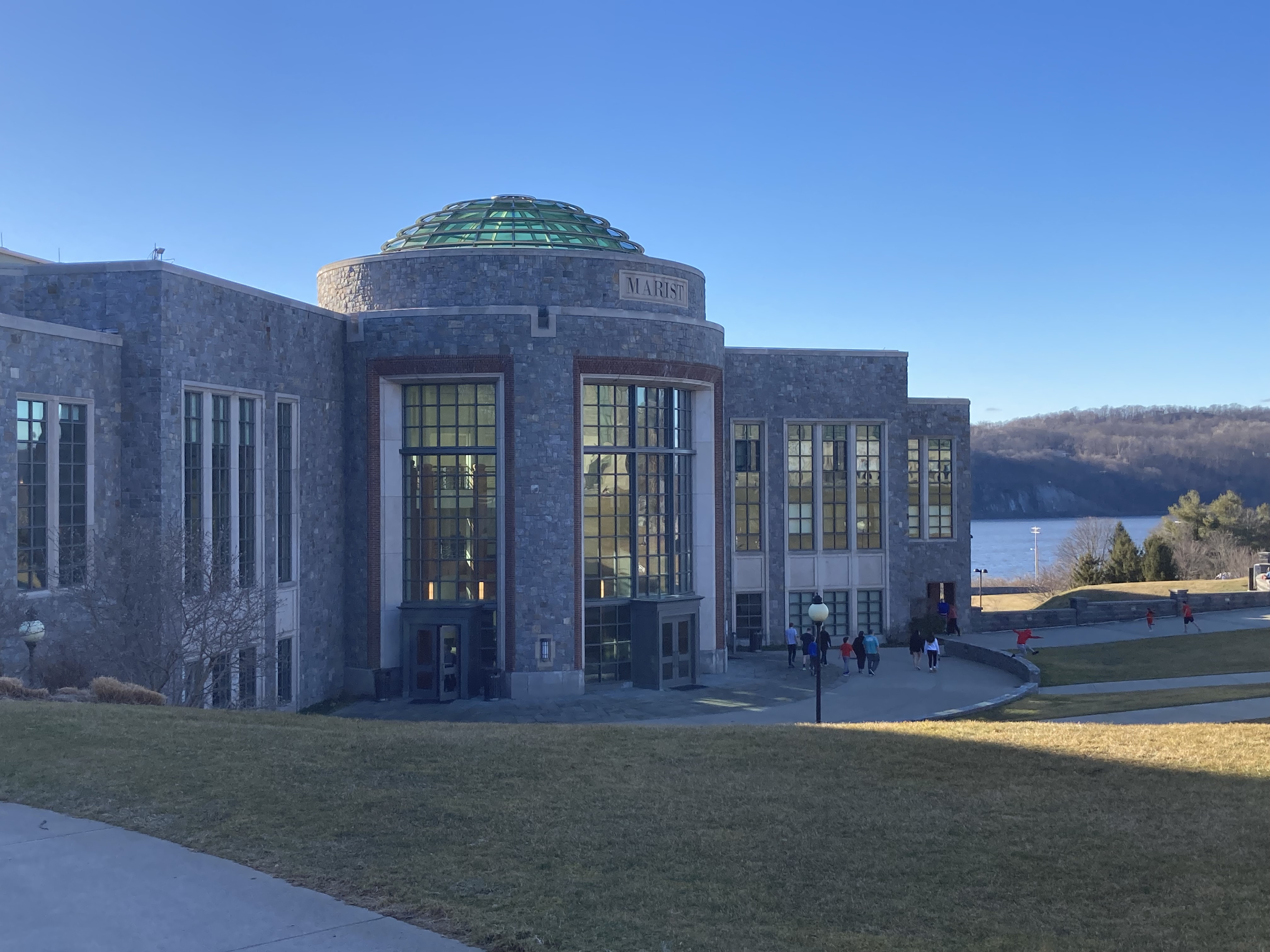
Murray Student Center rotunda

Marist University has 93 registered clubs and organizations that cover a variety of interests: performing arts, sports, religion, politics, and student government. All of the organizations are managed by the Office of College Activities. A sampling of these are described below.

=== Spiritual Life & Service ===
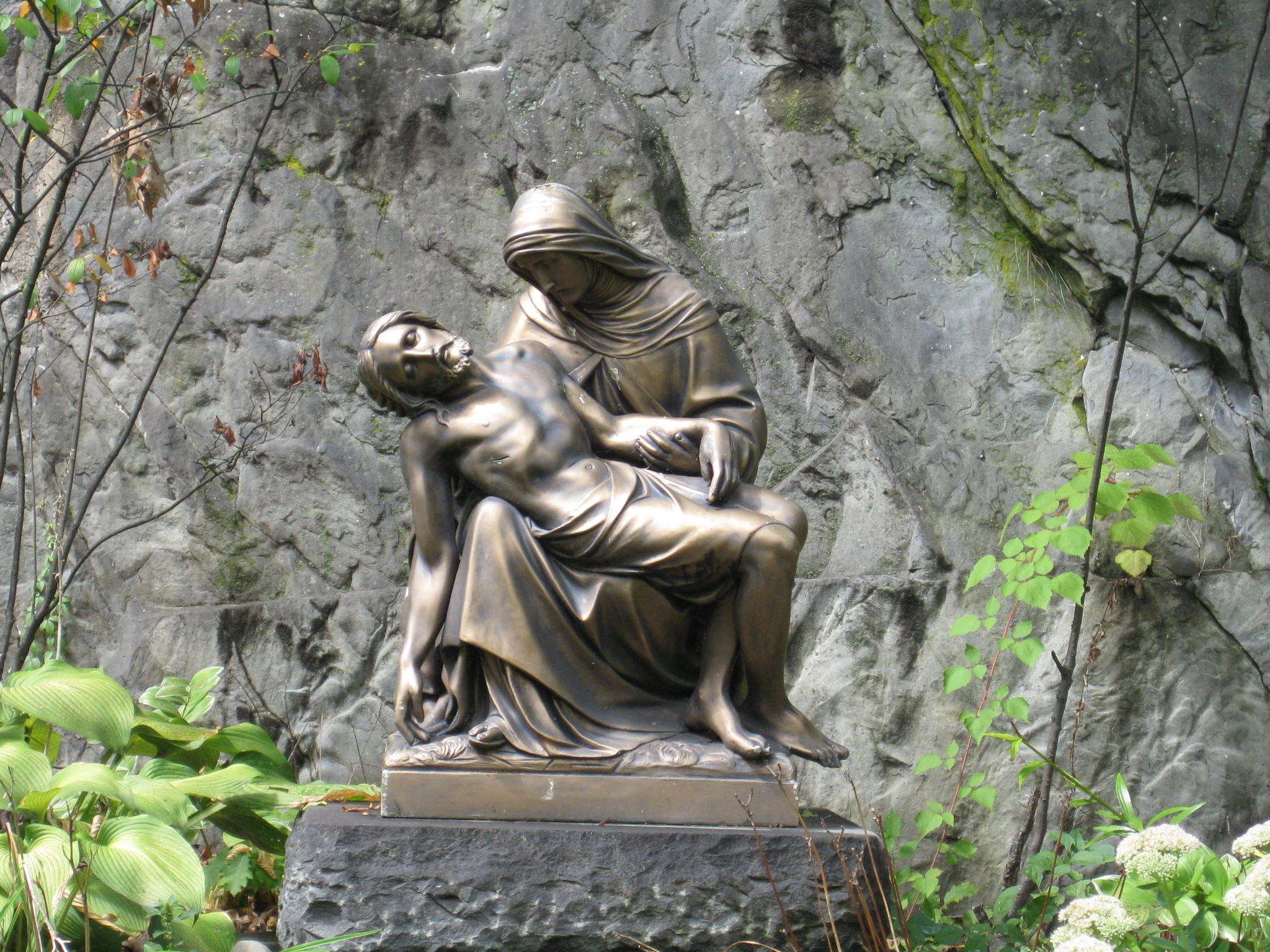
Marist Pietà

With over 1,000 members, the Department of Spiritual Life & Service (formerly Campus Ministry) is the largest of the Marist student organizations. The department sponsors retreats, community service and spirit-building programs while maintaining Marist's Judeo-Christian roots and the heritage of the Marist Brothers. The department strives to foster a culture of faith for the institution and the surrounding Poughkeepsie community by building and nourishing hospitality, prayer, service and education.

=== Student government ===
The Marist University Student Government Association is made up of three branches: the Executive Board, the Student Senate, and the Student Judicial Board.

=== Community work ===
Several Marist student groups are actively involved with several local and national charities. Habitat for Humanity has a very active Marist University Chapter in which students volunteer for local and national fundraising, building and education projects. Other charitable causes sponsored by MCSGA are St. Jude Children's Research Hospital, Relay for Life and Fox P.A.W. (People for Animal Welfare), which is dedicated to raising awareness about the mistreatment of animals in the surrounding community in conjunction with the Dutchess ASPCA.

A Marist tradition conducted by Spiritual Life & Service is the Giving Tree Program. At the beginning of each holiday season, trees in campus buildings are decorated with color-coded ornaments designating different gift categories needed by local families. Each ornament is tagged with an item corresponding to its category. Marist community members remove a tag from an ornament then purchase and wrap the present while attaching the corresponding ornament tag. The presents will be brought to Marist's Our Lady Seat of Wisdom Chapel for the students' annual Christmas liturgy. The Giving Tree Program has sponsored more than 500 families and donated over 16,000 gifts since its inception in 1991, providing presents ranging from winter clothing and household necessities to toys, games and more.

Marist University has also donated computing time on its computers to assist World Community Grid. To date they have donated over 30,000 years of computing time.

=== Literary organizations ===
There are four student-run literary organizations: The Circle, Center Field, Generator Magazine and the Literary Arts Society. Founded in 1941 as the Greystone Gazette, and renamed in 1965 to The Circle, the school newspaper, is published weekly online and in print. Center Field, the online sports publication was founded in 2018 and covers Marist athletics. Generator Magazine features student written poetry and short-stories. The Literary Arts Society produces two students publications; The MOSAIC, a literary magazine printed once a semester, publishes creative works by students as well as the winners of the annual Fiction and Poetry contest. The FoxForum prints academic papers and opinion pieces written by students; it is published every month.

=== Theatre ===
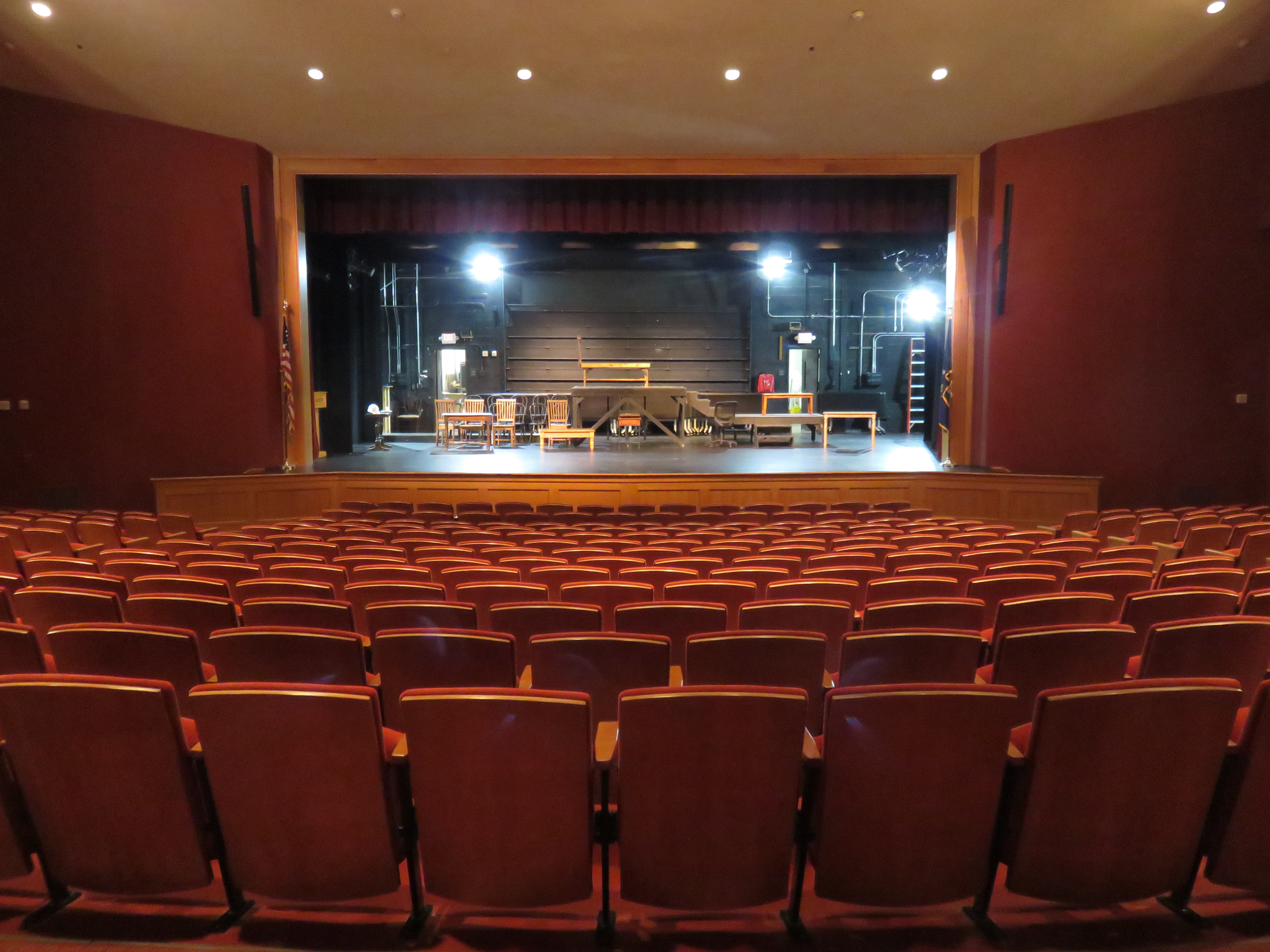
Nelly Goletti Theatre

Theatre at Marist includes the academic Marist Theatre Program, MCCTA and a relationship with River Valley Rep Theatre. The primary performing venue of the theatre program is the Nelly Goletti Theatre which is located in the Murray Student Center.

Marist Theatre Program includes the English Department's Concentration in Theatre, Theatre Minor, mainstage productions, professional workshops, Theatre Alumni Hall of Fame, theatre scholarships, theatre work-study, theatre internships, Pre-College Summer Theatre Institute, Alpha Psi Omega and the Annual Anderson Memorial Playwriting Contest. A host of theatre courses are offered each year, including Acting, Directing and Playwriting.

MCCTA (Marist College Club of Theatre Arts) is the institution's student-run theatre organization. MCCTA produces seven productions a year.

River Valley Rep is a professional theatre company in summer residence at Marist. They organize a season of contemporary musicals and comedies. River Valley Rep works in agreement with Actors' Equity Association and has an intern program available to Marist students.

=== MCTV and WMAR ===
Marist has a student-run TV channel and radio station, MCTV and WMAR. MCTV broadcasts its own shows, including original programming, sporting events and news. WMAR Broadcasts on 88.1 FM 24/7 365 days a year. Each day, 16 of those hours are filled with content provided by Marist students live, in two-hour show formats. There is also a program dedicated to Marist sports teams that broadcasts news and live home and away sporting events. WMAR is currently trying to change to podcasts on YouTube.

=== Marist Student Booster Club ===
The Marist Student Booster Club is an organization that is dedicated to supporting all Marist Athletic teams. The Student Booster Club looks to host events throughout the year in conjunction with many different athletic competitions. Some of the club's goals are to host pre-game events, coordinate bus trips to high-profile away games and raise the student attendance for all Marist Athletics events.

=== Marist Band ===
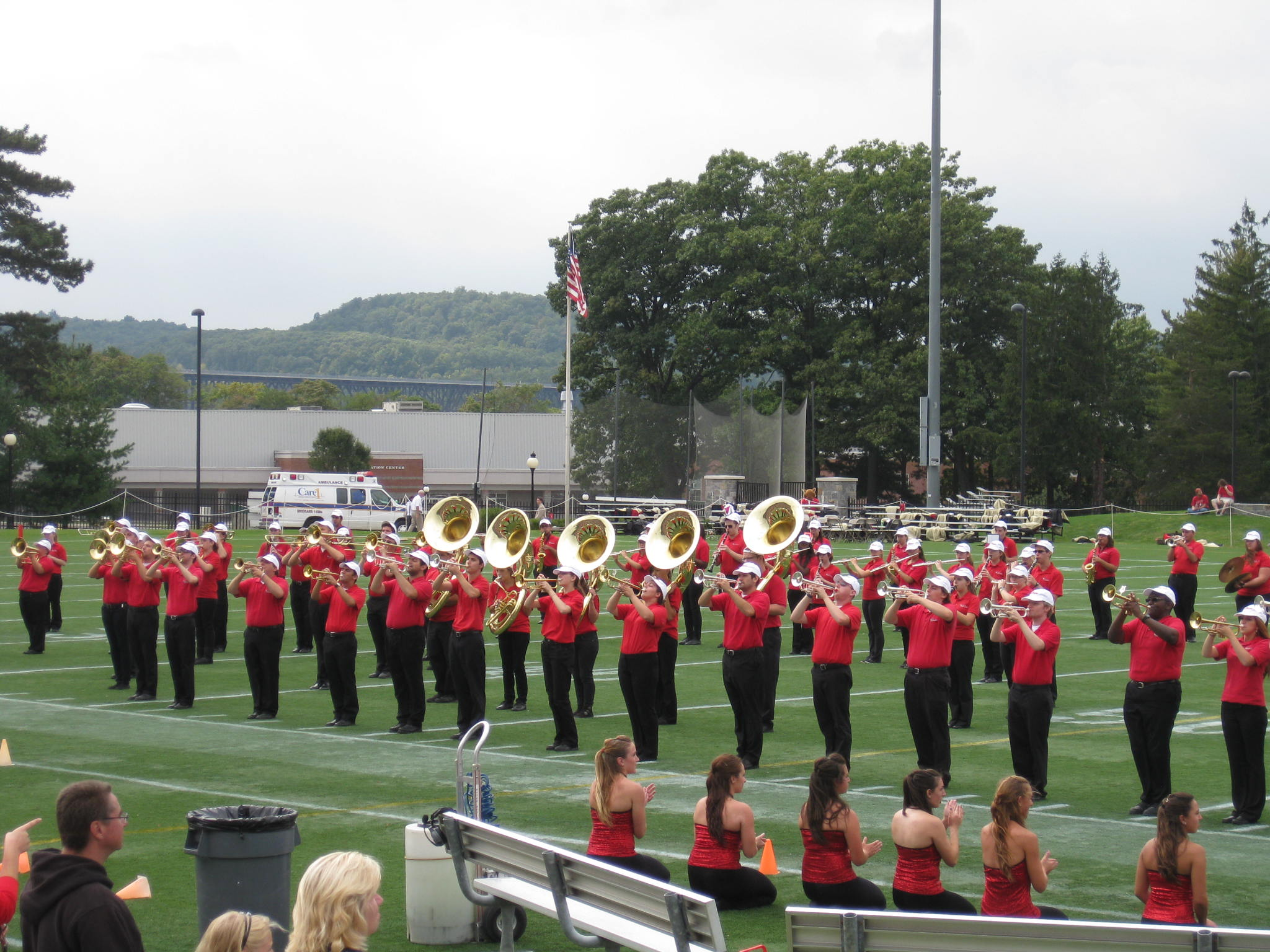
Marist Band performing during halftime of a home football game

The Marist University Band involves approximately 150 students performing in a variety of ten ensembles. The namesake and largest of these ensembles is the Marist Band. The band performs full symphonic concert programs of standard band literature, tours nationally, prepares a half-time show each Fall for performance at home football games, performs at Marist home basketball games and at the MAAC Championship Basketball tournament which occurs the first weekend in March. Membership in this large ensemble entitles the student to also participate as a member of the Brass Ensemble, Flute Choir, Jazz Foxes, Percussion Ensemble, Wind Symphony, and Woodwind Ensemble. Other ensembles that flourish under the 'umbrella' of the Marist Band include Chamber Strings, Guitar Ensemble, Handbell Choir, and Orchestra.

=== Marist Singers ===
The Marist University Singers consists of approximately 180 students, performing in seven ensembles. The Marist Singers main choir performs a variety of classical, popular, Broadway, and religious compositions. They performed for the Pope in Rome and on several occasions with Kenny Rogers. Other performances have been held in places such as Disney World and Puerto Rico. Membership in Marist Singers entitles the students to also participate in Chamber Singers (by audition), Enharmonics (Marist's co-ed a cappella group), Time Check (Marist's all-male a cappella group), Sirens (Marist's all-female a cappella group), Gospel Choir, Freshman Women's Choir, and Chapel Choir (which sings at masses). The Chamber Singers performed at the World Choral Fest in 2018 and 2016 (in Austria and Kansas City, respectively) and sang at Carnegie Hall on multiple occasions.

=== Silver Needle Fashion Show ===
The Silver Needle Fashion Show is an event held every spring to showcase the talents of student designers. The show is wholly produced by students and faculty of the Fashion Program. Members of the Fashion Show Production class organize committees dealing with every facet of the show from invitations to choreography and marketing. The shows routinely have attendance of over 2000 people. In 2011 the show was held at the Mid-Hudson Civic Center and marked its 25th anniversary.

=== Fraternities and sororities ===
Several are on the campus.

=== Reserve Officers' Training Corps ===
Marist has an active Army ROTC program on campus. The program is based out of the original St. Ann's Hermitage building. It is a satellite program and home of C Company of Army ROTC's Yankee Battalion, hosted by Fordham University which hosts various cadet programs in the region. Cadets also come from nearby Vassar College, SUNY New Paltz, Mount Saint Mary College, Orange County Community College and Dutchess Community College.

== Athletics ==
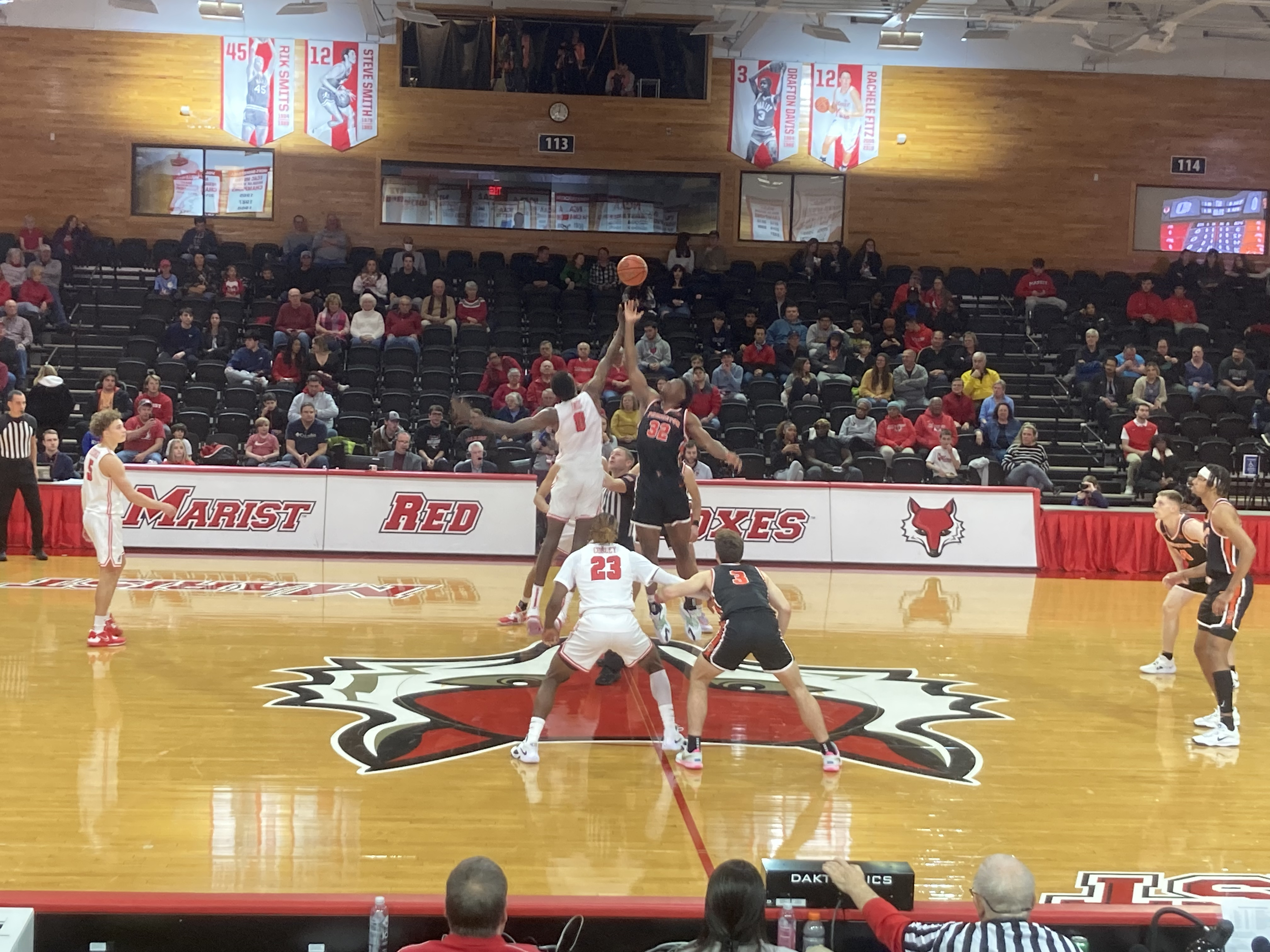
Marist men's basketball vs Princeton University

The Marist department of athletics sponsors 23 NCAA Division I sports. Most of the programs compete in the Metro Conference, with the only exception being football, a member of the Pioneer Football League (PFL). Separate men's and women's teams are sponsored for basketball, tennis, crew, lacrosse, soccer, cross country, track, swimming and diving. Sponsored women's teams are softball, volleyball, and water polo, while sponsored men's teams are baseball and football. These varsity programs involve more than 550 Marist student-athletes. The crew programs are among the few in the nation that claim on-campus facilities. Marist has been recognized by Sports Illustrated as having one of the top 200 college athletic programs in the U.S. Student athletes at Marist routinely excel in the classroom. In 2019 for the 18th straight year Marist led the MAAC with 262 selections to the conference's Academic Honor Roll. Marist also had 57 student athletes selected to the PFL's Academic Honor Roll and four men's rowers named to the Intercollegiate Rowing Association (IRA) 2019 All-Academic Team.

=== Club and intramural sports ===
In addition to Division I programs, the Department of Athletics also offers many other sports on the club and intramural levels. Club sports are very popular and give Marist students the opportunity to compete against other colleges and universities without the strict requirements of the NCAA. Club sports offered at Marist include men's ice hockey, which competes in the American Collegiate Hockey Association, men's and women's rugby, cheerleading, men's volleyball, equestrian, fencing, bowling, skiing, dance and ultimate, among others.

== Notable alumni ==
Marist University has approximately 30,000 living alumni worldwide.
