= Dennis J. Murray =

American academic administrator

Dr. Dennis J. Murray

President of Marist College
- In office 2019–2021
- Preceded by: David N. Yellen
- Succeeded by: Kevin Weinman
- In office 1979–2016
- Preceded by: Linus Richard Foy
- Succeeded by: David N. Yellen

Personal details
- Born: September 24, 1946 (age 80) Los Angeles, California
- Education: California State University, Long Beach (B.A.); University of Southern California (M.A., Ph.D.)

Dennis J. Murray (born September 24, 1946) is an American academic administrator who was the third President of Marist College, serving from 1979 to 2016 and again from 2019 to 2021.

== Early life ==
Murray was born in Los Angeles, California. He received a bachelor's degree in political science from California State University, Long Beach and his master's degree and Ph.D. in public administration from the University of Southern California.

== Career ==
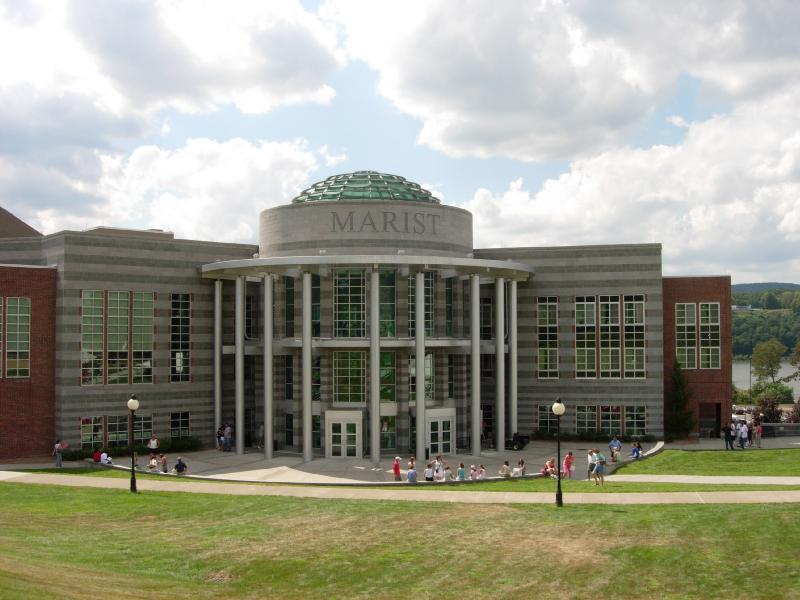
Marist College Student Center

He served as Director of University Relations and Executive Assistant to the President at California State University, Long Beach, Steve Horn. In 1972 Murray took a leave of absence from that position to run in California's 32nd Congressional District. He was the unsuccessful Democratic nominee against longtime Republican incumbent Craig Hosmer.

Murray taught at the USC School of International and Public Affairs, and later served as Vice President for Development at Whittier College. "At Whittier he completed an $8 million capital campaign, including the funding of a $2.5 million student activities center."

In 1979, Murray was selected to be the third President of Marist College. In February 2015, Murray informed the board of trustees that he would be stepping down as president when his current contract was set to expire on June 30, 2016. Given his 37-year tenure as president of Marist, Murray has been the university's President Emeritus since July 1, 2016.

During Murray's lengthy tenure, Marist saw its enrollment more than double, 16 new academic programs were established, several new academic centers and student residences were added, and the property was expanded to 180 acres (0.73 km^{2}).

Following Murray's retirement, David N. Yellen was appointed President of the College. Yellen had spent eleven years as Dean and Professor of Law at Loyola University Chicago School of Law. After President Yellen resigned three years later to become CEO of the Institute for the Advancement of the American Legal System, Murray returned as interim president.

Murray's second tenure at the helm of Marist, as interim president, was from June 19, 2019 to October 2021. He was then succeeded by Kevin Weinman, CFO and CAO at Amherst College, as the 5th President of the College.

== Selected honors and awards ==
- Franciscan Award from the Sisters of St. Francis
- Americanism Award from the Anti-Defamation League
- Eleanor Roosevelt Val-Kill Medal, 1996
