= Chat Paterson =

American soldier, intelligence official, and activist (1920 – 1992)

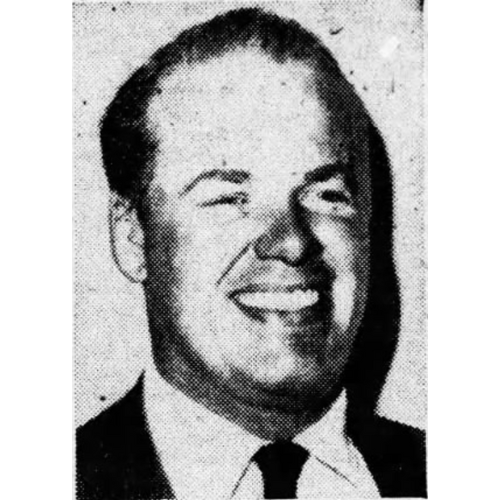
- Paterson in 1947

2nd National Chairman of the American Veterans Committee
- In office 1947–1948
- Preceded by: Charles G. Bolté
- Succeeded by: Gilbert A. Harrison

Personal details
- Born: Lewis Paterson; June 26, 1920 Ottumwa, Iowa, U.S.
- Died: March 5, 1992 (aged 71) Golden, Colorado, U.S.
- Party: Democratic
- Spouse: Joanne Kuth (m. 1950)
- Children: 6
- Education: Western Reserve Academy; Antioch College

Military service
- Branch/service: United States Army; Office of Strategic Services
- Years of service: 1942 – 1945
- Rank: Second lieutenant
- Battles/wars: World War II

Lewis "Chat" Paterson (June 26, 1920 – March 5, 1992) was an American soldier, intelligence official, and activist who served as the second national chairman of the American Veterans Committee.

== Early life and education ==
Paterson was born on June 26, 1920 in Ottumwa, Iowa, and raised in Cleveland, Ohio, the son of Walter C. Paterson and Virginia Lewis. Paterson was a descendant of Francis Lewis, signer of the United States Declaration of Independence.

In 1933, Paterson won a scholarship to the Western Reserve Academy where he graduated in 1938. He attended Antioch College, where he studied public administration.

== Wartime service ==
Beginning in the late 1930s, Paterson worked for the Quaker fellowship and American Friends Service Committee as a relief worker in Cuba and Mexico, where he aided in the resettlement of European refugees.

During World War II, Paterson worked for the United States Department of State, and then served in the United States Army as an air cadet. Beginning in 1944, he was stationed in Europe as an agent with the Office of Strategic Services, where he carried out missions in documents intelligence. Paterson attained the rank of second lieutenant, and was appointed as head of the Continental Central Intelligence Division of the OSS, with duty in all Army units in the European Theater of Operations.

=== Nuremberg trials ===
Paterson was assigned to Germany to procure incriminating documents from the home of Alfred Rosenberg, head of the Reich Ministry for the Occupied Eastern Territories. While taking part in the search of his house, Paterson uncovered copies of Rosenberg's top secret reports to Adolf Hitler. The discovered evidence aided in Rosenberg's conviction of crimes against peace; planning, initiating and waging wars of aggression; war crimes; and crimes against humanity at the Nuremberg trials in 1946. The evidence also aided in the conviction of Vidkun Quisling.

== Later career ==
After returning to the United States following the second world war, Paterson briefly worked for the State Department as acting chief of the trainee section of the International Exchange of Persons Division. He also was an early member of the Society for the Prevention of World War III.

In 1946, Paterson became involved with the American Veterans Committee (AVC), including serving as its national legislative representative. He was a guest panelist on March 1946 and May 1947 episodes of The American Forum of the Air.

At its second national convention in 1947, he was elected as the AVC's second national chairman, succeeding Charles G. Bolté. While in the role, Paterson advocated for adequate housing and racial integration for military veterans. During his time as national chairman, he led efforts to push back against the efforts of the House Un-American Activities Committee, including passing a resolution favoring the abolition of the committee. He referred to the committee as "undemocratic" and a group which espoused "dangerous methods and practices of totalitarianism."

Paterson completed his term as national chairman in late 1948, and returned to serving as the organization's national legislative representative and a member of its national committee. In the late 1940s, Paterson lobbied for a national health insurance plan sought by President Harry Truman, which did not come to fruition. He remained on the organization's board for several decades.

Paterson testified to the U.S. Congress on several occasions. In 1946, Paterson testified before the Senate Committee on Finance in favor of granting Social Security credits for military service. He argued that veterans should receive Social Security protection for their service period, ensuring they do not lose benefits due to their time in the armed forces. His recommendation was to treat military service as covered employment under the Social Security system, which would provide continuity of benefits for those who served during wartime and peacetime. In 1947, Paterson urged Secretary of Defense James Forrestal to end racial discrimination and segregation in the armed forces.

Outside of his advocacy for veterans and members of the armed services, Paterson worked as an industrial realtor and builder, and helped develop affordable housing programs in the inner city of Cleveland. He later moved to Colorado, where he was an active real estate developer in the Denver metropolitan area and active in Democratic politics. He oversaw the construction of Brooks Tower, which was the tallest building in Denver. He also served on the Colorado Tourism Board, Colorado Limited Gaming Control Commission, and the Denver Metro Convention and Visitors Bureau.

=== Electoral history ===
Paterson ran for the U.S. House of Representatives in 1950, 1952, 1954, 1958, 1960, and 1964 as the Democratic party nominee to represent Ohio's 22nd congressional district. He was defeated by Frances P. Bolton on each occasion. In October 1960, Paterson was appointed by John F. Kennedy to serve as his campaign manager for the 22nd district of Ohio, and also served on his campaign's advisory committee on natural resources.

President Truman referred to Paterson as a "good man" and a "good Democrat."

== Death ==
Paterson died of cancer on March 5, 1992 in Golden, Colorado, at the age of 72.

== Works ==
- Housing: The Job of Congress, 1948 (published in The Antioch Review)
