= Walter Gieseking =

German pianist (1895–1956)

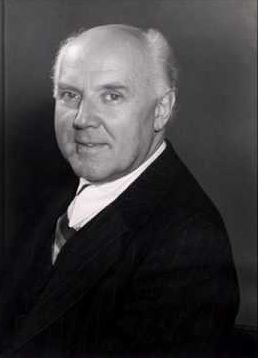
- Gieseking on 8 October 1949
- Born: 5 November 1895; Lyon, France
- Died: 26 October 1956 (aged 60)
- Occupations: Pianist, composer

Signature
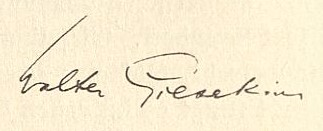

Walter Wilhelm Gieseking (5 November 1895 – 26 October 1956) was a French-born German pianist and composer. Gieseking was renowned for his subtle touch, pedaling, and dynamic control—particularly in the music of Debussy and Ravel; he made complete recordings of all their published works which were extant during his life. He also recorded most of Mozart's solo piano works.

== Career ==
External audio
- You may hear Walter Gieseking performing Ludwig van Beethoven's Piano Concerto No. 4 in G major, Op. 58 with Karl Böhm conducting the Sächsische Staatskapelle Dresden in 1939 Here on archive.org

Born in Lyon, France, the son of a German doctor and lepidopterist, Gieseking first started playing the piano when he was four, without formal instruction. His family traveled frequently and he was privately educated.

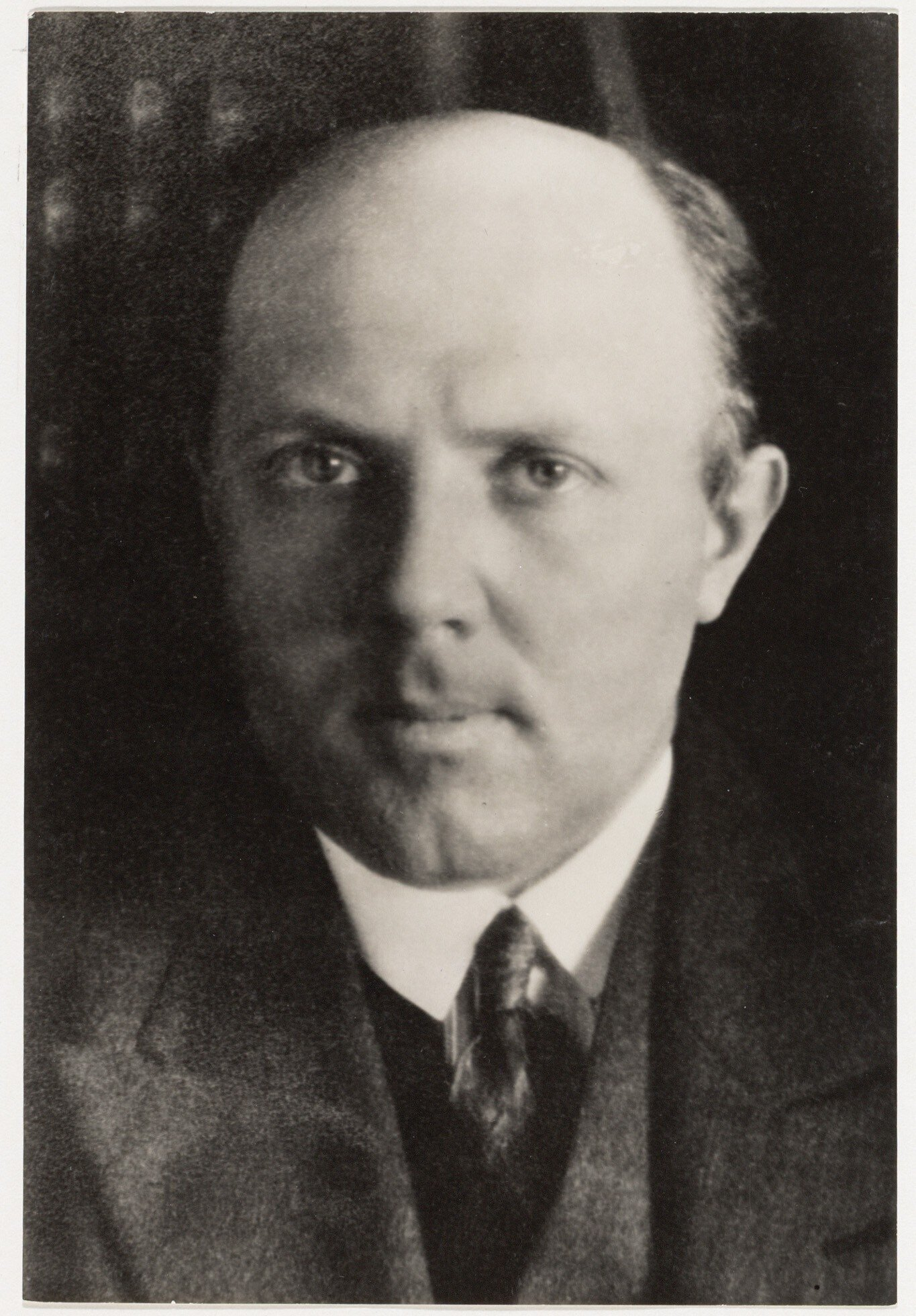
Walter Gieseking (1929)

From 1911 to early 1916, he studied at the Hanover Conservatory. There his mentor was the director Karl Leimer, with whom he later coauthored a piano method. He made his first appearance as a concert pianist in 1915, but was conscripted in 1916 and spent the remainder of World War I as a regimental bandsman. His first London piano recital took place in 1923, establishing an exceptional and lasting reputation.

During World War II, Gieseking continued to reside in Germany, while continuing to concertize in Europe, and was accused of having collaborated with the Nazi Party. He was criticized for this by Vladimir Horowitz, who, in David Dubal's book Evenings with Horowitz, called Gieseking a "supporter of the Nazis", and by Arthur Rubinstein, who recounted in his book My Many Years a conversation with Gieseking in which Gieseking said, "I am a committed Nazi. Hitler is saving our country." Gieseking performed in front of Nazi cultural organizations such as the NS Kulturgemeinde and "expressed a desire to play for the Führer". Along with a number of other German artists, Gieseking was blacklisted during the initial postwar period, but by January 1947, he had been cleared by the U.S. military government, enabling him to resume his international career, although his U.S. tour scheduled for January 1949 was canceled owing to protests by organizations such as the Anti-Defamation League and the American Veterans Committee. There had been other protests (in Australia and Peru, for example), but Giesking's 1949 American tour was the only group of concerts actually canceled due to the outcry. He continued to play in many other countries, and in 1953 he finally returned to the U.S. His concert in Carnegie Hall was sold out and well received.

Because of his gifts of a natural technique, perfect pitch, and abnormally acute faculty for memorization, Gieseking mastered unfamiliar repertoire with relatively little practice. From his early instruction in the Leimer method, he usually studied new pieces away from the piano. It became well known to the public, for instance, that he often committed new works to memory while traveling by train, ship or plane. Sometimes, according to Harold C. Schonberg's book The Great Pianists (1963), he could even learn an entire concerto by heart in one day.

Gieseking had a very wide repertoire, ranging from various pieces by Bach and the core works by Beethoven to the concertos of Rachmaninoff and more modern works by composers such as Busoni, Hindemith, Schoenberg and the lesser-known Italian Petrassi. He gave the premiere of Hans Pfitzner's Piano Concerto in 1923. Today, he is particularly remembered for his recordings of the complete piano works of Wolfgang Amadeus Mozart and the two French impressionist masters Claude Debussy and Maurice Ravel, virtually all of whose solo piano music he recorded on LP for EMI in the early 1950s (the Mozart and Debussy sets have recently been rereleased on CD), after recording much of it for Columbia in the 1930s and 1940s, some of which have also been rereleased on CD.

Gieseking's 1944 performance of Beethoven's "Emperor" Concerto, in which anti-aircraft fire is audible in the background, is one of the earliest stereo recordings, following a rendition of the same work in 1934 for Columbia, with Bruno Walter conducting the Vienna Philharmonic. In December 1955, Gieseking suffered head injuries in a bus accident near Stuttgart, in which his wife was killed.

His last recording project was the complete cycle of Beethoven's piano sonatas. Gieseking suddenly fell ill in London while recording Beethoven's “Pastoral” Sonata for His Master's Voice. He had completed the first three movements and was to record the finale the next day, but died a few days later of postoperative complications for the relief of pancreatitis. His Master's Voice released the unfinished recording, and since then broadcast recordings of Gieseking playing all of Beethoven's piano sonatas (except Op. 54, which he never recorded) have been issued. Although some of his performances, particularly live, were marred by wrong notes, Gieseking's best performances, as in-studio recording sessions, were virtually flawless.

Parallel to Gieseking's work as a performing artist, he was also a composer. During his lifetime his compositions were hardly known, and he made no attempt to publicize them.

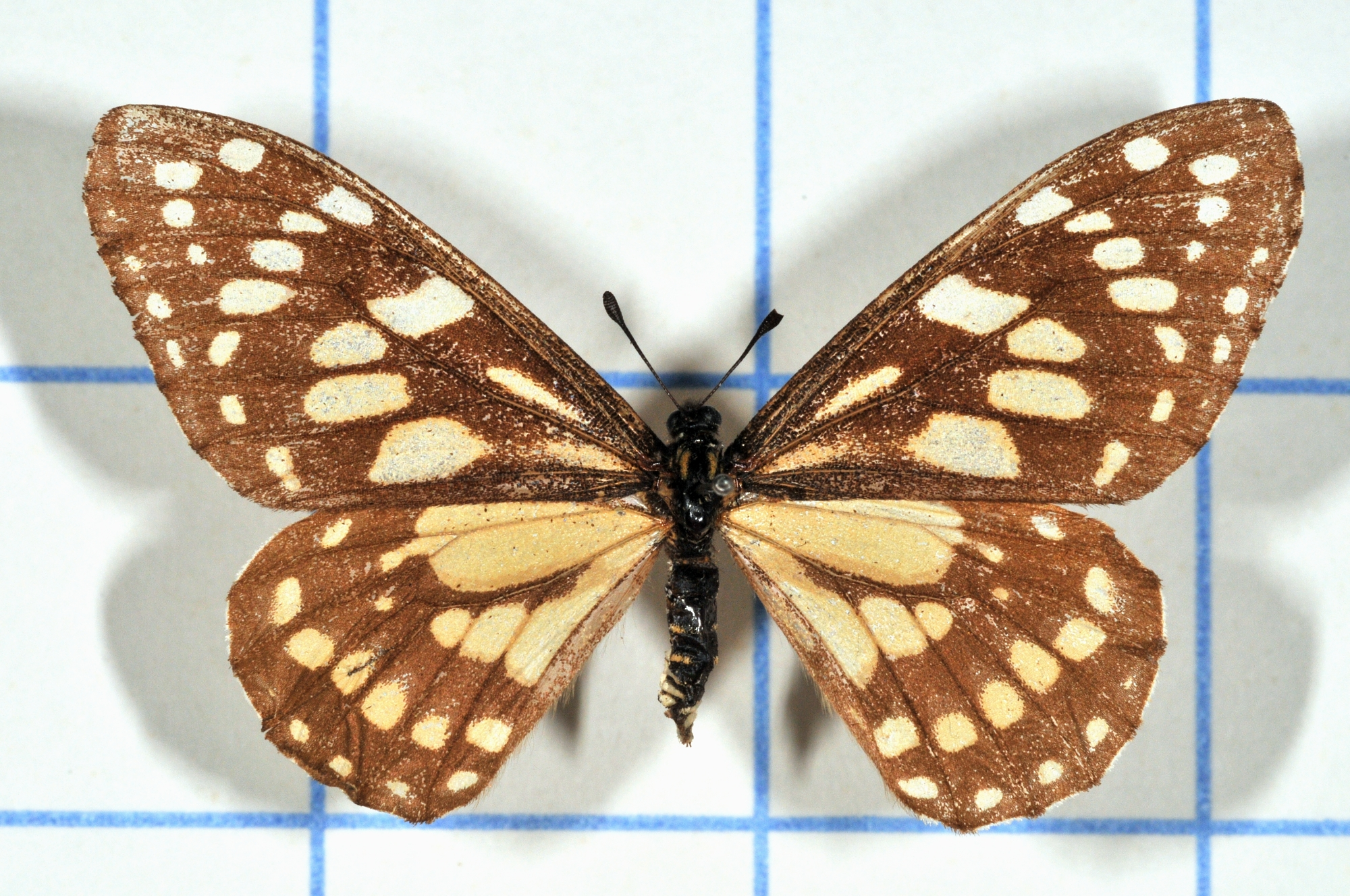
Baronia brevicornis of the Coll. Gieseking, Museum Wiesbaden, Germany

External audio
- You may hear Walter Gieseking performing Johann Sebastian Bach's: Jesu, Joy of Man's Desiring, BWV 147; French Suite No. 5 in G major, BWV 816 – Gigue in 1939; Here on archive.org

Gieseking himself was a lepidopterist, devoting much time to the collecting of butterflies and moths. His private collection can be seen in the Natural History Collection of the Museum Wiesbaden.

== Recordings ==
=== Compositions ===
- The Music of Walter Gieseking – Karen Hand (flute and piano), Nimbus Records, 2001

== Bibliography ==
- Morrison, Bryce (2001). "Gieseking, Walter". Grove Music Online. Oxford: Oxford University Press. doi:10.1093/gmo/9781561592630.article.11111. ISBN 978-1-56159-263-0. (subscription, Wikilibrary access, or UK public library membership required)
- Gieseking, Walter: So wurde ich Pianist (autobiography), Wiesbaden, Brockhaus 1963
- Gregor, Neil, The Symphony Concert in Nazi Germany. Chicago: University of Chicago Press. 2025. ISBN 978-0226839103.
- Kater, Michael S. The Twisted Muse: Musicians and their Music in the Third Reich, New York: Oxford, 1997.
- Leimer, Karl and Gieseking, Walter: The Shortest Way to Pianistic Perfection, Philadelphia, Presser 1932
- —, Rhythmics, Dynamics, Pedal and Other Problems of Piano Playing, Philadelphia, Presser 1938
- Leimer, Karl and Gieseking, Walter: Piano technique, New York, Dover 1972 (contains both books of 1932 and 1938)
- Schonberg, Harold C.: The Great Pianists, 1963
