= Charles B. Bolton =

American Dentist

Charles Bingham Bolton
- Known for: His contributions related to the Bolton Growth Study, development of Case Western University Dental School
- Medical career
- Profession: Dentist
- Sub-specialties: Orthodontics

Charles Bingham Bolton (1909–1976) was an American dentist known for developing the "Bolton Standards of Craniofacial Growth" that is often used during diagnosis of different malocclusions in the field of orthodontics.

== Life ==
He was son of the Congressman Chester C. Bolton and Frances P. Bolton. His mother succeeded his father's congressional post due to his father's untimely death. He initially studied at the Hawken School. He then attended Milton Academy, Massachusetts. Later on he served as the Chairman of the Hawken trustee group. Hawken later honored him with a teaching chair and its Distinguished Alumnus Award; also the school's "most esteemed award" is the Charles B. Bolton Award, given to a student who has excelled in "all aspects of education."

Charles played a huge role in developing the Franchester Farms which was a Guernsey dairy operation started by his father in 1919. He moved the farm to Ohio at a 1700-acre site and the farm became to known as one of the best known Guernsey herds in America. He then later supplemented the dairy operation with extensive Charolais and Yorkshire production. In 1953 the American Guernsey Cattle Club conferred on him its Certificate of Honor.

Charle's mother played a role in establishing the Frances Payne Bolton School of Nursing in Cleveland. Dr. Bolton was played an instrumental role in expanding the Case School of Dental Medicine. When expanded the building was designated the name Charles Bingham Bolton Building.

Dr. Bolton died at his home in Ohio due to stroke he suffered in 1976.

== Bolton Standards of Dentofacial Developmental Growth ==
Dr. Bolton is known for his contributions related to the Bolton study. This study was funded by his mother and Dr. Holly Broadbent Sr. was the director of this study. In 1975, he published the now famous articled named Bolton Standards of Dentofacial Developmental Growth.

The study was one of the longest studies that was done to study the effects of growth. This study was initiated and conducted by the Case Western Reserve University starting in 1930 and ending in 1973. There were 5,000 subjects involved in this study where about 22,000 records were taken. These individuals were mostly from the European descent and were aged 1–18 years old. The Bolton Standard of dentofacial growth were developed after the landmarks, cephalometric tracings and measurement of changes were determined. The study offers both hard and soft tissue profiles where an orthodontist may be able to choose the suitable landmark to superimpose the cephalometric radiograph. The standards developed by Charles Bolton's work are still used in many comparative studies, assessing both the hard and soft tissue profiles.

== Awards and Recognitions ==
- Albert H. Ketcham Award in Orthodontics
