= The Five Yanks =

Americans who fought in World War II before U.S. involvement

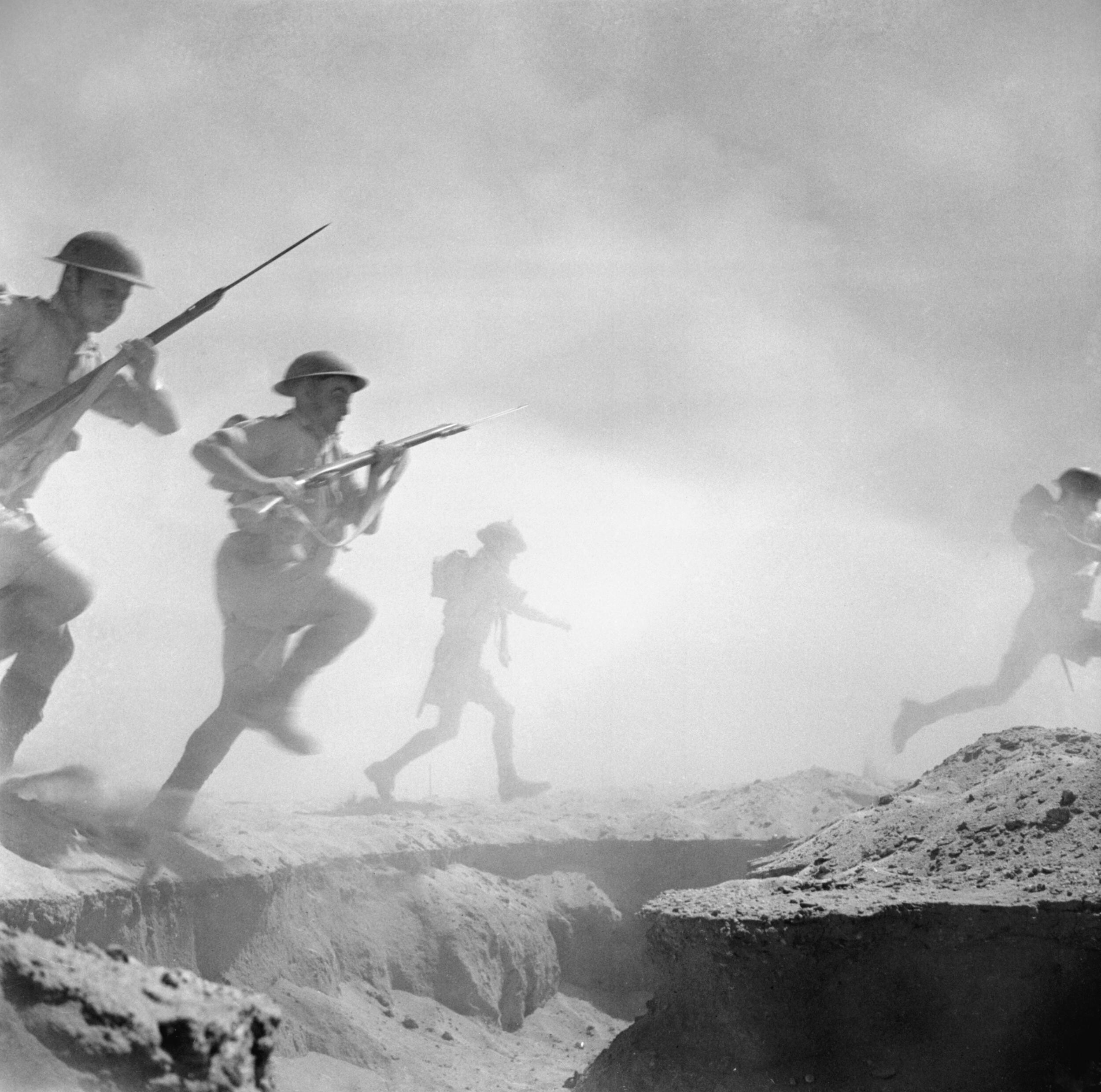
- Troops in the Second Battle of El Alamein, October 1942
- De facto leader: Charles G. Bolté
- Key people: Robert Cox; Charles G. Bolté; John F. Brister; William Durkee; Heyward Cutting
- Affiliations: British Eighth Army; King's Royal Rifle Corps

The "Five Yanks" were a group of five American volunteers, Robert Cox, Charles G. "Chuck" Bolté, John F. "Jack" Brister, William "Bill" Durkee, and Heyward Cutting, who enlisted in the British Army in 1941, before the United States entered World War II. They were among the first five Americans to fight against Nazi Germany on the ground, serving as officers in the King's Royal Rifle Corps and participating in the North African campaign. The men were referred to as the "Five Yanks" by the British press at the time, and as the "Five Musketeers" by U.S. Ambassador John G. Winant, and were some of the very first Americans to fight against fascism even before their country joined the conflict.

== Background ==
During the early years of World War II—before the United States entered the conflict—a group of five young Americans volunteered to fight for Britain against Nazi Germany. Nicknamed the "Five Yanks" by the British press, these men were Robert Cox, Charles G. "Chuck" Bolté, John F. "Jack" Brister, William "Bill" Durkee, and Heyward Cutting. All five were Ivy League students (three from Dartmouth College and two from Harvard University) who were dismayed by the U.S. government's reluctance to confront fascism in Europe.

In May–June 1941, more than six months before the attack on Pearl Harbor, they took the extraordinary step of enlisting in the British Army, effectively becoming the first American ground troops to fight the Nazi army in World War II. They received officers' training in England and were commissioned as second lieutenants in the King's Royal Rifle Corps. This unusual arrangement was made possible by British officials (including Foreign Secretary Anthony Eden and KRRC Colonel Sir Hereward Wake) with the support of U.S. Ambassador John G. Winant, who saw propaganda value in Americans fighting "shoulder to shoulder" with British troops.

The five volunteers departed New York in July 1941 via Canada and arrived in Britain in August, where they were welcomed as harbingers of eventual American involvement. Despite U.S. Neutrality Acts that technically forbade serving under a foreign flag, these men risked their citizenship to stand against fascism on principle. Winant affectionately dubbed them his "five musketeers," and British citizens emerging from the Blitz expressed gratitude for their commitment.

=== Service in North Africa ===
After months of training in England (at places like Winchester) and acclimation in Egypt, the Five Yanks were deployed as platoon leaders with the British Eighth Army in North Africa. They were assigned to motorized infantry units with the famed "Desert Rats" and attached to the 4th Light Armoured Brigade during the decisive Second Battle of El Alamein in October 1942. On the southern sector of the Alamein line, Lieutenants Jack Brister and Bill Durkee led their platoons into the initial assault, helping divert Axis fire in support of the main British offensive. Meanwhile, a short distance away, Lieutenants Chuck Bolté, Heyward Cutting, and Rob Cox took up roles further north with the 1st Armoured Division, all as part of the KRRC contingent integrated into British forces. The Second Battle of El Alamein proved to be a turning point of the war. The five Americans saw heavy action in this 12-day battle. Four of the five were wounded in the intense fighting against Field Marshal Erwin Rommel's Afrika Korps. Only Lt. Brister emerged from El Alamein uninjured. Lt. Bolté was gravely wounded by an artillery shell, Lt. Cox was shot in the back, and Lts. Durkee and Cutting also sustained serious injuries from shell fragments and gunfire. Their presence was touted in Allied news reports—the spectacle of American volunteers in British uniform was used to boost morale, symbolizing the "Yanks" fighting alongside Brits even before the U.S. formally entered the war.

After Alamein, the five were separated by circumstance. Lieutenant Bolté's right leg had to be amputated near the hip due to his wounds, removing him from active combat. Lieutenants Durkee and Cutting also required long recoveries in military hospitals in Egypt. Only Brister and Cox were fit enough to remain on the front lines by early 1943, just as the final phase of the North African campaign was underway. Both Cox and Brister fought through battles like the Mareth Line offensive in Tunisia. However, neither would live to see the Allied victory in North Africa. Lt. Robert Cox was killed by a sniper on April 19, 1943, during operations near Djebel Zaghouan in Tunisia. Just eight days later, on April 27, 1943, Lt. Jack Brister was struck by a stray artillery shell and killed near Medjez-el-Bab. Brister"s death came only about two hours before official papers arrived approving his transfer to the U.S. Army, a move he had requested so he could rejoin his countrymen once American forces were in the field. Both Brister and Cox were buried in Commonwealth war cemeteries in Tunisia, and their sacrifice as Americans in British service was noted with honor by comrades and the press.

== Members ==
=== Robert H. Cox (1919–1943) ===
Robert Hill Cox was a recent Harvard graduate from New Jersey when he volunteered for the British Army in 1941. Born into a prominent American family (he was a descendant of founding father Roger Sherman and U.S. Secretary of State William M. Evarts), Cox grew up with a strong sense of patriotic duty. In college he supported U.S. intervention against Hitler, and his draft lottery number was near the top of the list in 1941. Unwilling to "sit mediocre" while war raged, Cox decided to act: "I love America, and I could not sit [by] while America was being attacked...America is a faith and...must be dynamic or perish," he wrote in a letter to his mother to be opened in the event of his death. In May 1941, during a visit to Dartmouth College, Cox helped persuade several friends to join him in volunteering for the British forces.

Cox and the others enlisted through the British embassy and were commissioned into the King's Royal Rifle Corps. After training in England, Lt. Cox was deployed to North Africa in mid-1942, where he commanded an infantry platoon in the 7th Armoured Division during the Second Battle of El Alamein. There he was shot in the back and wounded, one of several injuries that temporarily took him out of action. He recovered and rejoined his unit for the Tunisia campaign in early 1943. On April 19, 1943, Lt. Cox was leading his men in the hills near Djebel Zaghouan, Tunisia, when he was killed by an enemy sniper. He was 24 years old at his time of death. His name appears on Harvard's memorial honor roll for World War II. Cox received a military funeral service that also included part of a traditional British church service.

His brother Archibald Cox later served as Solicitor General of the United States. His niece, journalist Rachel S. Cox, later chronicled his story and those of his four compatriots in the book Into Dust and Fire.

=== Charles G. "Chuck" Bolté (c.1920–1994) ===
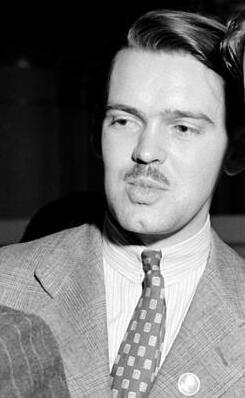
Bolté in 1945

Charles Guy Bolté was a Dartmouth College senior from Connecticut and Rhodes Scholar who emerged as the de facto leader of the Five Yanks. While still an undergraduate in April 1941, Bolté won national attention by publishing an open letter to President Franklin D. Roosevelt headlined "Now we have waited long enough," imploring the U.S. to join the fight against Hitler. This impassioned plea, printed on the front page of the Dartmouth student newspaper, was reprinted in papers across the country and even read into the Congressional Record by U.S. Senator William H. Smathers. Bolté's outspoken interventionism reflected his conviction that America could not stand aside. In mid-1941, upon learning through British contacts that Americans could enlist in the UK forces, he and two Dartmouth classmates (Brister and Durkee) volunteered alongside Harvard men Cox and Cutting. After commissioning, Lt. Bolté was posted to North Africa with the 7th Armoured Division. At the Second Battle of El Alamein in October 1942, he led a motor platoon into combat and was severely wounded during the fierce engagements. A shell blast mangled his right leg; after an agonizing month of treatment, doctors amputated the leg near the hip to save his life. Bolté was invalided back to the United States in June 1943, walking with an artificial leg. In July 1943 he married his college sweetheart and soon began devoting himself to advocacy for his fellow veterans. Bolté became a prominent voice in the American Veterans Committee (AVC), a progressive, racially integrated veterans' organization whose motto was "Citizens first, veterans second." As the AVC's national chairman and spokesman in the late 1940s, he campaigned for veterans' benefits, civil rights, and world peace, arguing that the ideals for which the war was fought should shape the post-war world. Bolté also worked in publishing (including as an editor at Viking Press) and later at the Carnegie Endowment for International Peace. He authored several books; his first, The New Veteran (1945), was dedicated to "John Frederick Brister and Robert Hill Cox – brave men who died fighting and were their own memorial." Bolté lived a long life despite his wartime injuries. He remained a writer and public intellectual into the 1950s and 1960s, and even named one of his sons John Cox Bolté to honor his fallen comrades. Charles G. Bolté died in 1994.

=== John F. "Jack" Brister (1920–1943) ===
John Frederick "Jack" Brister was a Dartmouth graduate (Class of 1941) from Ambler, Pennsylvania, known for his intellectual and creative talents. He was an honor graduate of Ambler High School. In college he was a writer of plays and stories and co-founder of a campus literary magazine, The Dartmouth Pictorial. In his senior year, he won a play contest and received praise from Robert E. Sherwood. Brister's graduation editorial in June 1941 captured his moral resolve: after initially penning a satire on war, he concluded that although he "conscientiously object[ed] to war" on principle, "America must fight Hitler... We're ready. Ready to fight. Ready to destroy. Ready, if necessary, to be destroyed." This nuanced conviction – opposing war's horror yet recognizing the necessity of combating fascism – typified Brister's outlook. Along with Bolté and Durkee, his Dartmouth classmates, Brister joined the British Army in mid-1941, completing officer training and shipping out to North Africa by mid-1942. Lieutenant Brister commanded an anti-tank infantry platoon in the KRRC attached to the 7th Armoured Division at El Alamein. In that massive battle, Brister distinguished himself as the sole American among the five not wounded in action. Fellow soldiers noted his "infectious grin" and quiet courage under fire, which earned the respect and affection of the British Tommies he led.

After Alamein, Brister continued to fight through the North African campaign. By early 1943, he was the last uninjured American officer in his KRRC battalion – the others had all been killed or sent to hospitals by then. Feeling it was time to serve directly under the U.S. flag, Brister applied for a transfer to the United States Army once American ground forces began arriving in North Africa. His British commanders, who valued him, had assured the five volunteers that such a transfer would be allowed when the time came. On April 14, 1943, Brister wrote to his commandant, "For twenty-three years I have been pledging allegiance to the United States of America. The time has come to turn those words of allegiance into action." Permission was granted, but on April 27, 1943, Lt. Brister was killed in action by shellfire during the final push toward Tunis, just two hours before his transfer papers arrived. British comrades mourned Brister deeply – his men had "idolized him" for traveling thousands of miles to join their fight, and they remembered him as a brave, spirited officer who "took a dim view of wars, but 'ere 'e is fightin' 'is blinkin' 'eart out" in spite of it. Brister was laid to rest at the Medjez-El-Bab War Cemetery in Tunisia. News of his sacrifice made U.S. headlines (including a piece titled "Last U.S. Rifleman"), highlighting the poignant irony of his story and cementing his legacy as an early American hero of WWII who gave his life before his country's flag was officially in the battle.

=== William "Bill" Durkee (c.1919–1982) ===
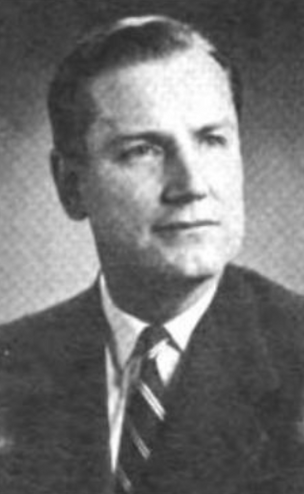
U.S. Department of Defense portrait of Durkee, 1964

William Porter "Bill" Durkee III was a Dartmouth '41 graduate from Illinois, who shared his classmates' resolve to stop Nazi Germany's aggression. Less inclined to literary pursuits than Brister or Bolté, Durkee excelled in economics and politics and had a clear-eyed grasp of the geopolitical stakes – he believed that a Nazi victory would be catastrophic for civilization. When his friends decided to volunteer for the British Army, Durkee quickly agreed, driven by the conviction that Hitler had to be confronted as soon as possible. Commissioned into the KRRC, Lt. Durkee led a motor platoon side by side with Brister's unit at El Alamein in October 1942. In the battle's early hours, Durkee advanced with the 7th Armoured Division's thrust, facing heavy enemy fire. He was seriously wounded amid the fighting, suffering injuries that would incapacitate him for many months. After El Alamein, Durkee was transported to a hospital in Alexandria, Egypt, where he remained bedridden through early 1943 while his wounds slowly healed. By April 1943 he was finally able to stand again, and in July that year he was sent back to England to convalesce further.

Recognizing Durkee's unique service, U.S. Ambassador John Winant arranged for him to work in the American Embassy in London during recovery. In mid-1944, with his health improved, Lt. Durkee returned to the United States and separated from military service. Like Bolté, he took advantage of educational opportunities, enrolling at Yale Law School and earning his law degree in the post-war years. Durkee then embarked on a career in international affairs and public service. He worked in the U.S. State Department and later joined the newly formed Central Intelligence Agency, where by the 1960s he served as a division chief under Cord Meyer in covert international information programs. Durkee also held a senior civilian defense post: in 1962–63 he was appointed Deputy Assistant Secretary of Defense for Civil Defense, helping to coordinate U.S. civil defense strategy during the Cold War. In later years, he was associated with Radio Free Europe and other international endeavors, and eventually entered the private sector. Durkee lived a long life after the war; he married, raised three children, and remained engaged in public service. He died in 1982.

=== Heyward Cutting (1921–2012) ===
Heyward Cutting was the youngest of the Five Yanks – only 19 years old in 1941 – and the only one who had not yet finished college. Born in New York City on December 3, 1921, Cutting was a member of wealthy American industrial family (his relatives included members of the Cutting and Roberson families). After his father's early death, Heyward was partly raised in England, developing close friendships there. In 1940–41, he was a sophomore at Harvard University, but as the war spread he grew "anxious to rejoin" his British friends in their hour of peril. When Robert Cox (his Harvard classmate) and the others invited him to enlist in the British Army, Cutting enthusiastically agreed despite his youth. He was commissioned as a second lieutenant in the KRRC at age 19. After training in Britain, Lt. Cutting deployed to North Africa with the rest of the group. In the Second Battle of El Alamein, he led a platoon in the 1st Armoured Division's sector and was wounded during the intense combat. His injuries required a long recovery period; he spent many months in hospitals and convalescent depots following El Alamein. By the time he recuperated in late 1943, the North African campaign was over, so Cutting was reassigned to staff duties. He served at the Allied Forces HQ in Italy for the remainder of the war, contributing to planning and logistics for operations in the Mediterranean theater. Cutting was promoted to major and ultimately returned home to the United States in August 1945, after the Allied victory. In contrast to some of his comrades, Heyward Cutting did not pursue a public or political career post-war. Instead, he became an architect and urban planner. He married and settled in Massachusetts, raising a family. In his professional life, Cutting worked as a vice-president of an engineering firm (Geometrics, Inc.) and was involved in community affairs in Concord, MA. Heyward Cutting died on March 18, 2012, at the age of 90. At the time of his death, he was the last surviving member of the Five Yanks.

== Significance and legacy ==
The story of the "Five Yanks" holds a unique place in World War II history, illustrating the courage of private American citizens who took action against tyranny even before their nation was officially at war. Their decision to volunteer for the British Army in 1941 had both symbolic and practical impacts. Symbolically, they represented the conscience of a segment of American youth who felt a moral imperative to stop fascism—a fact that Allied propaganda eagerly highlighted. British media covered the five Ivy League volunteers extensively, portraying them as proof of American commitment to the Allied cause and predicting that the United States would eventually join the fight. Their presence served to strengthen transatlantic camaraderie at a critical time. In historical accounts of Americans in World War II, they have been occasionally cited as an early example of volunteerism. Their story enhances an understanding of American sentiment in 1940–41, showing that many were unwilling to remain neutral "watchers" of the war. Historian Jean Martin noted that their experience was a coming-of-age tale of "camaraderie" and shared idealism in battle. The group's letters and diaries – preserved by families and later compiled by Rachel Cox, niece of Robert Cox – offer richly detailed first-hand perspectives on both the battlefield (especially North Africa) and the personal moral choices involved in going to war. These primary sources have provided material for scholars and writers interested in the American role in the early war.

== In popular culture ==
The story of the Five Yanks has been documented in modern literature and media. Journalist Rachel S. Cox, a niece of Robert H. Cox, authored the non-fiction book Into Dust and Fire: Five Young Americans Who Went First to Fight the Nazi Army (published 2012), which chronicles the full story of these men. The book provides a narrative of their early lives, the decision to volunteer, and their experiences in combat with the British Eighth Army, drawing heavily on their personal correspondence and diaries. Into Dust and Fire brought the Five Yanks' story to a broad audience.
