= Rachel S. Cox =

- Occupation: Writer
- Writing career
- Pen name: Rachel Cox
- Notable works: Into Dust and Fire
- Website: rachelscox.com

Rachel Cox is an American journalist and the author of Into Dust and Fire.

== Personal life ==
Cox grew up surrounded by her father's large, tightly knit family. Her father was one of "five remarkable brothers" who included Watergate Special Prosecutor Archibald Cox and her mysterious uncle Robert who was one of the first Americans to serve in World War II.

From a young age Cox was fascinated with her uncle Robert who was killed in the war. Yet her family rarely talked about him, and Cox was "left to conjecture about anything more" about her uncle. Later, his story became the inspiration for her book Into Dust and Fire. In an interview about her book, she said, "Researching Into Dust and Fire was a kind of liberation from those familial constraints."

Cox has two sons and currently lives in Washington, D.C.

== Career ==
Cox earned a Bachelor of Arts cum laude in English from Harvard University, where she wrote her thesis on Thomas Hardy.

She is a contributing writer for CQ Researcher, an award-winning weekly magazine published by Congressional Quarterly. Her articles have appeared in Washington Post, World War II Magazine, AARP Bulletin, Landscape Architecture, as well as other nationally-published magazines. Cox is a former editor of Preservation magazine. In her role as a staff writer at Time-Life Books, she wrote for the Civil War and the Fighting Jets series.

== Published works ==
=== Selected articles ===
- "They Just Said No." World War II Magazine. March/April 2015.
- "Review: The Fight for the Four Freedoms: What Made FDR and the Greatest Generation Truly Great." Washington Independent Review of Books. April 28, 2014.
- "The Leading Edge: Americans at El Alamein." HistoryNet.com. November 5, 2012.

=== Into Dust and Fire ===
==== Synopsis ====
Published in April 2012, Into Dust and Fire: Five Young Americans Who Went First to Fight the Nazi Army, is Cox's first book and tells the story of five American students who left the United States in the spring of 1941 in order to fight alongside the British in World War II. In the spring of 1941, Cox notes, "it was not at all certain which side would triumph" in the war. The five Americans enlisted in the British Army six months before the attack on Pearl Harbor and U.S. involvement in World War II. These men were: Robert Cox, Charles G. Bolté, Jack Brister, Bill Durkee, and Heyward Cutting.

After training, the five Americans were assigned to the 7th Armored Division of the British Eighth Army on the North African front. Nicknamed the "Five Yanks" by the British press, Cox, Bolté, Brister, Durkee, and Cutting were the subject of frequent wartime propaganda that represented the Americans "fighting shoulder to shoulder" with the British." The soldiers first saw combat in the pivotal Second Battle of El Alamein in Egypt. While fighting against Erwin Rommel's forces in the critical North African campaign, four out of the five Americans were injured. After the battle the Americans were separated and continued to fight on the North African front, and in December 1941 the United States officially entered the war. Cox, the author's uncle, and Brister died in the Battle of Mareth in 1943.

Cox drew upon primary sources of the diaries and letters written by the five American soldiers to construct her book.
