= Office of Civil Defense =

US federal agency tasked with civilian health in the event of military attack (1961-1979)

Agency overview
- Formed: August 1, 1961; 65 years ago
- Preceding agencies: Office of Civil and Defense Mobilization; Federal Civil Defense Administration
- Dissolved: July 20, 1979; 47 years ago
- Superseding agency: Federal Emergency Management Agency
- Jurisdiction: Federal government of the United States
- Headquarters: Washington, D.C.
- Employees: 1,148 (1962)
- Annual budget: 256.8 million (1962)
- Parent department: Department of Defense
- Key documents: Executive Order 10952; Executive Order 12148

Office of Civil Defense Drinking Water Container

The Office of Civil Defense (OCD) was an agency of the United States Department of Defense from 1961–64. It replaced the Office of Civil and Defense Mobilization. The organization was renamed the Defense Civil Preparedness Agency on May 5, 1972, and was abolished on July 20, 1979, pursuant to Executive Order 12148. Its duties were given to the Federal Emergency Management Agency (FEMA).

== Regions ==
The Office of Civil Defense was organized into several regions, in order to better manage the distribution of funds, coordination of local training and resources and support state and local agencies planning and perpetration. In May 1962 there were eight regions.

1962 Office of Civil Defense Regions
| Region | Headquarters | States and Territories |
|---|---|---|
| 1 | Harvard, MA | Connecticut, Delaware, Maine, Massachusetts, New Hampshire, New Jersey, New York, Rhode Island, Vermont, Puerto Rico, Virginia Islands |
| 2 | Olney, MD | Kentucky, Maryland, Ohio, Pennsylvania, Virginia, West Virginia, District of Columbia |
| 3 | Thomasville, GA | Alabama, Florida, Georgia, Mississippi, North Carolina, South Carolina, Tennessee, Panama Canal Zone |
| 4 | Battle Creek, MI | Illinois, Indiana, Michigan, Minnesota, Wisconsin, |
| 5 | Denton, TX | Arkansas, Louisiana, New Mexico, Oklahoma, Texas |
| 6 | Denver, CO | Colorado, Iowa, Kansas, Missouri, Nebraska, North Dakota, South Dakota, Wyoming |
| 7 | Santa Rosa, CA | Arizona, California, Hawaii, Nevada, Utah, American Samoa, Guam |
| 8 | Everett, WA | Alaska, Idaho, Montana, Oregon, Washington, |

== Directors ==
Denotes acting capacity.

| Name | Start | End | President |
|---|---|---|---|
| Steuart Pittman | September 15, 1961 | April 7, 1964 | John F. Kennedy (1961–1963) |
| Steuart Pittman | September 15, 1961 | April 7, 1964 | Lyndon B. Johnson (1963–1969) |
| William Durkee | April 7, 1964 | January 1, 1967 | Lyndon B. Johnson (1963–1969) |
| Joseph Romm | January 1, 1967 | May 20, 1968 | Lyndon B. Johnson (1963–1969) |
| Joseph Romm | May 20, 1968 | January 20, 1969 | Lyndon B. Johnson (1963–1969) |
| John Davis | May 20, 1969 | January 20, 1977 | Richard Nixon (1969–1974) |
| John Davis | May 20, 1969 | January 20, 1977 | Gerald Ford (1974–1977) |
| Bardyl Tirana | April 13, 1977 | July 20, 1979 | Jimmy Carter (1977–1981) |

== Office of Civilian Defense ==
The Office of Civilian Defense (OCD) was established by President Franklin D. Roosevelt in May 1941. It was responsible for planning community health programs and medical care of civilians in the event of a military attack on the United States. It was an independent agency and not associated with the United States Department of War. It coordinated with the Chemical Corps of the Department of the Army regarding protective measures against chemical weapons. United States Public Health Service officers were assigned as medical consultants with OCD local district offices. Later in 1941, right-wing Senators added an amendment to forbid OCD from supporting physical fitness instruction “By dancers, fan dancing, street shows, theatrical performances, or other public entertainment.”

== See also ==
- Emergency Broadcast System
- Civil defense Geiger counters
- Civil Defense Sirens in the United States
- United States Department of Homeland Security
