= Ohio's 22nd congressional district =

Defunct U.S. Congress electoral division

Coordinates: 41°30′N 81°30′W

- Obsolete district
- Created: 1915
- Eliminated: 1980
- Years active: 1915-1983

The 22nd congressional district of Ohio was eliminated as a result of the redistricting cycle after the 1980 census.

In its last decade, the district primarily consisted of eastern Cuyahoga county, with minor parts of western Geauga, western Lake, and northern Summit counties.

== List of members representing the district ==
Member	Party	Year(s)	Cong ress	Electoral history
District established March 4, 1915
Henry I. Emerson (Cleveland)	Republican	March 4, 1915 – March 3, 1921	64th 65th 66th	Elected in 1914. Re-elected in 1916. Re-elected in 1918. Lost renomination.
Theodore E. Burton (Cleveland)	Republican	March 4, 1921 – December 15, 1928	67th 68th 69th 70th	Elected in 1920. Re-elected in 1922. Re-elected in 1924. Re-elected in 1926. Resigned when elected U.S. Senator.
Vacant		December 15, 1928 – March 3, 1929	70th	
Chester C. Bolton (Cleveland)	Republican	March 4, 1929 – January 3, 1937	71st 72nd 73rd 74th	Elected in 1928. Re-elected in 1930. Re-elected in 1932. Re-elected in 1934. Lost re-election.
Anthony A. Fleger (Parma)	Democratic	January 3, 1937 – January 3, 1939	75th	Elected in 1936. Lost re-election.
Chester C. Bolton (Lyndhurst)	Republican	January 3, 1939 – October 29, 1939	76th	Elected in 1938. Died.
Vacant		October 29, 1939 – February 27, 1940	76th	
Frances P. Bolton (Cleveland)	Republican	February 27, 1940 – January 3, 1969	76th 77th 78th 79th 80th 81st 82nd 83rd 84th 85th 86th 87th 88th 89th 90th	Elected to finish her husband's term. Re-elected in 1940. Re-elected in 1942. Re-elected in 1944. Re-elected in 1946. Re-elected in 1948. Re-elected in 1950. Re-elected in 1952. Re-elected in 1954. Re-elected in 1956. Re-elected in 1958. Re-elected in 1960. Re-elected in 1962. Re-elected in 1964. Re-elected in 1966. Lost re-election.
Charles Vanik (Euclid)	Democratic	January 3, 1969 – January 3, 1981	91st 92nd 93rd 94th 95th 96th	Redistricted from the 21st district and re-elected in 1968. Re-elected in 1970. Re-elected in 1972. Re-elected in 1974. Re-elected in 1976. Re-elected in 1978. Retired.
Dennis E. Eckart (Euclid)	Democratic	January 3, 1981 – January 3, 1983	97th	Elected in 1980. Redistricted to the 11th district.
District dissolved January 3, 1983

== Election results ==
The following chart shows historic election results. Bold type indicates victor. Italic type indicates incumbent.

Year	Democratic	Republican	Other
1920	Mathew B. Excell: 30,738	Theodore E. Burton: 91,062	Max J. Sillins: 760
1922	William J. Zoul: 20,511	**Theodore E. Burton**: 57,781	D. B. Washburn: 401
1924	Sam B. Fitzsimmons*: 32,970	**Theodore E. Burton**: 95,174	Alfred F. Coyle: 25,489; A. V. Severino (W): 259
1926	[ none ]	**Theodore E. Burton**: 55,589	[ none ]
1928	Simon B. Fitzsimmons*: 65,742	Chester C. Bolton: 151,565	[ none ]
1930	Edward F. Carran: 55,868	**Chester C. Bolton**: 91,222	Helen Green: 13,372
1932	Florence E. Allen: 98,427	**Chester C. Bolton**: 141,296	G. Racheff (C): 803; Joe T. Thomas: 367
1934	William C. Dixon: 88,551	**Chester C. Bolton**: 99,535	C. B. Cowan (C): 2,046; Max Epstein (S): 943
1936	Anthony A. Fleger: 144,660	Chester C. Bolton: 137,570	[ none ]
1938	Anthony A. Fleger: 87,635	**Chester C. Bolton***: 109,494	[ none ]
1940	Anthony A. Fleger: 126,273	**Frances P. Bolton***: 165,322	[ none ]
1942	James Metzenbaum: 69,601	**Frances P. Bolton**: 92,644	[ none ]
1944	Don O. Cameron: 137,546	**Frances P. Bolton**: 185,187	[ none ]
1946	Earl Heffley: 69,050	**Frances P. Bolton**: 174,823	Matthew DeMore: 9,029
1948	Jack G. Day: 141,018	**Frances P. Bolton**: 170,085	[ none ]
1950	Chat Paterson: 130,623	**Frances P. Bolton**: 219,788	[ none ]
1952	Chat Paterson: 61,197	**Frances P. Bolton**: 87,316	[ none ]
1954	Chat Paterson: 44,072	**Frances P. Bolton**: 61,738	[ none ]
1956	Harry A. Blachman: 48,169	**Frances P. Bolton**: 96,468	[ none ]
1958	Chat Paterson: 57,508	**Frances P. Bolton**: 71,143	[ none ]
1960	Chat Paterson: 66,930	**Frances P. Bolton**: 88,389	[ none ]
1962	Edward Corrigan: 35,353	Frances P. Bolton: 74,603	Ronald B. Peltz: 5,595
1964	Chat Paterson: 64,454	**Frances P. Bolton**: 84,183	[ none ]
1966	Anthony O. Calabrese Jr.: 56,803	**Frances P. Bolton**: 71,927	[ none ]
1968	**Charles A. Vanik***: 102,686	Frances P. Bolton: 84,975	[ none ]
1970	**Charles A. Vanik**: 114,790	Adrian Fink: 45,657	[ none ]
1972	**Charles A. Vanik**: 126,462	Donald W. Gropp: 64,577	Thomas W. Lippitt (AI): 3,463; Caryl A. Loeb: 3,342
1974	**Charles A. Vanik**: 112,671	William J. Franz: 30,585	[ none ]
1976	**Charles A. Vanik**: 128,535	Harry A. Hanna: 42,727	Thomas W. Lippitt (A): 5,461
1978	**Charles A. Vanik**: 87,551	Richard W. Sander: 30,930	Robert E. Lehman: 6,966; James F. Sexton: 7,125
1980	**Dennis E. Eckart***: 108,137	Joseph J. Nahra: 80,836	Arnold Gleisser: 6,896

- Possible error in records: Simon B. Fitzsimmons, the Democratic nominee in 1928, is likely the same person as Sam B. Fitzsimmons, the Democratic nominee in 1924. There is no indication of which is the correct name.
