= Karl Leimer =

German music teacher and pianist

Karl Leimer (22 June 1858 – 19 July 1944) was a German music teacher and pianist.

== Life and work ==
The son of sculptor Peter Anton Leimer and his wife Pauline, he grew up in Biebrich and Wiesbaden, where he attended the Humanist Gymnasium as well as the Realgymnasium. From the winter semester of 1875 he studied at the Polytechnic School of Karlsruhe, where he studied civil engineering. At the instigation of the Württemberg court pianist Wilhelm Krüger (1820–1883), he switched to music, and studied piano with him from 1878 to 1882 at the Stuttgart Music School. In addition, he studied music theory with Immanuel Faisst, and music history and instrumentation with Ludwig Stark. After graduating in 1882, Leimer was a piano teacher at the Konigsberg Conservatory, and became its director the following year. In 1891, his first pedagogic work on piano playing was published for use at the Conservatory.

In 1896, Leimer moved to Hannover, and in October 1897 he founded a private music and theater school there, the direct precursor of today's College of Music and Theatre in Hanover, together with two other co-founders and directors – the Hanoverian court pianist Emil Evers and the chamber singer Hermann Brune. This school was a great success in Hanover. From 1912, it was approved by the "Städtisches Conservatorium für Musik", but remained a private enterprise. In 1918 Leimer published his Handbuch für den Klavierunterricht in den Unter- und Mittelstufe (Teaching manual for teaching beginner and intermediate level piano). His school was recognized by the state in 1926.

He applied the method he developed for teaching the piano to his most famous student, Walter Gieseking: he later published pedagogic works on piano playing together with Gieseking. In 1931 they co-wrote Modernes Klavierspiel nach Leimer-Gieseking (The Shortest Way to Pianistic Perfection), a work intended to instruct piano teachers that was translated into English in 1932. The book was such a success that Leimer wrote another textbook, published in 1938: Rhythmik, Dynamik, Pedal und andere Probleme des Klavierspiels nach Leimer-Gieseking (Rhythmics, Dynamics, Pedal and Other Problems of Piano Playing, by Leimer-Gieseking). After a long dispute with the heirs of his deceased business partner, Leimer relinquished the management of the conservatory in 1934, and was succeeded by Walter Höhn. However, he remained the director of the parent company.

Karl Leimer was the great-uncle of pianist, composer and piano pedagogue Kurt Leimer.

== Influence ==
The method of piano tuition he developed together with Gieseking have had a lasting influence in the piano world: their textbooks have run into many editions, and have been translated into many languages.

== Bibliography ==
- Leimer, Karl and Gieseking, Walter: The Shortest Way to Pianistic Perfection, Philadelphia, Presser 1932
- Leimer, Karl and Gieseking, Walter: Rhythmics, Dynamics, Pedal and Other Problems of Piano Playing, Philadelphia, Presser 1938
- Leimer, Karl and Gieseking, Walter: Piano technique, New York, Dover 1972 (contains both books of 1932 and 1938)
