= William P. Durkee III =

American diplomat, lawyer, and public official (1919 – 1982)

William Durkee
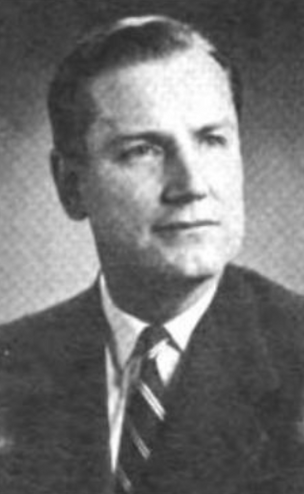
- 1964 Portrait of Durkee

President of Radio Free Europe
- In office 1967–1975
- Preceded by: Lucius D. Clay
- Succeeded by: Sig Mickelson

2nd Director of the Office of Civil Defense
- In office April 7, 1964 – January 1, 1967
- President: Lyndon B. Johnson
- Preceded by: Steuart Pittman
- Succeeded by: Joseph Romm

Deputy Assistant Secretary of Defense for Civil Defense
- In office September 20, 1961 – April 1, 1964
- President: John F. Kennedy; Lyndon B. Johnson
- Preceded by: Position established
- Succeeded by: Position abolished

Personal details
- Born: William Porter Durkee III; April 27, 1919 Chicago, Illinois, U.S.
- Died: May 6, 1982 (aged 63) Denver, Colorado, U.S.
- Resting place: Rose Hills Memorial Park
- Spouse: Dorcas Dunklee
- Children: 3
- Education: Dartmouth College (BA); Yale University (LLB)
- Awards: Distinguished Civilian Service Award

Military service
- Branch/service: British Army
- Years of service: 1941–1944
- Rank: Second Lieutenant
- Unit: King's Royal Rifle Corps
- Battles/wars: World War II • Second Battle of El Alamein

William Porter Durkee III (April 27, 1919 – May 6, 1982) was an American diplomat, lawyer, and public official, who served as a Central Intelligence Agency (CIA) division chief, second director of the Office of Civil Defense, Deputy Assistant Secretary of Defense for Civil Defense during the Cold War, president of National Committee for a Free Europe and the last president of Radio Free Europe before its merger with Radio Free Liberty. During World War II, he was an infantryman in the "Five Yanks."

== Early life and family ==
William Porter Durkee III was born in Chicago, Illinois on April 27, 1919, the son of William P. Durkee II and Helen Chapman Durkee. His family later moved to California where he spent much of his childhood. After high school, Durkee attended Dartmouth College where he graduated cum laude in 1941 after studying economics and politics.

Durkee married Dorcas M. Dunklee and they had three children.

== World War II service ==
During the early years of World War II—before the United States entered the conflict—Durkee was one of five young Americans who volunteered to fight for Britain against Nazi Germany, a group that was referred to as the "Five Yanks." Durkee was dismayed by the U.S. government's reluctance to confront fascism in Europe.

In May 1941, more than six months before the attack on Pearl Harbor, Durkee enlisted in the British Army, effectively becoming one of the first American ground troops to fight the Nazi army in World War II. He received officers' training in England and was commissioned as a second lieutenant in the King's Royal Rifle Corps. Along with the other four American men, Durkee deployed as a platoon leader with the British Eighth Army in North Africa. He was assigned to a motorized infantry unit with the famed "Desert Rats" and attached to the 4th Light Armoured Brigade during the decisive Second Battle of El Alamein in October 1942. On the southern sector of the Alamein line, Lieutenant Durkee led his platoon into the initial assault, helping divert Axis fire in support of the main British offensive. During the 12-day battle, Durkee sustained serious injuries from shell fragments and gunfire. His presence was touted in Allied news reports—the spectacle of American volunteers in British uniform was used to boost morale, symbolizing the "Yanks" fighting alongside Brits even before the U.S. formally entered the war.

After Alamein, Durkee required a six-month stay in a military hospital in Alexandria, Egypt. In April 1943, he was able to stand again, and in July 1943 he was sent back to England for further recovery.

== Public service ==
During Durkee's recovery while in England, U.S. Ambassador John Gilbert Winant arranged for him to work as a military liaison officer in the American Embassy in London. In 1944, after he had fully recovered, Durkee returned to the United States and received a medical discharge from military service. After returning home, he enrolled in Yale Law School where he received his Juris Doctor.

After law school, Durkee briefly worked in private practice, worked for the U.S. Department of State, and later became an early staff member of the newly formed Central Intelligence Agency. In 1950, Durkee joined the American Committee on United Europe at the request of William J. Donovan. From 1955 to 1958, Durkee lived in Paris serving as attaché to the U.S. Ambassador to NATO Warren Randolph Burgess. He returned to the United States working for the CIA, and by the early 1960s, he attained the post of division chief, serving under Cord Meyer in covert international information programs.

=== Civil Defense ===
In 1961, President John F. Kennedy appointed Durkee as the 1st Deputy Assistant Secretary of Defense for Civil Defense, serving as deputy to Assistant Secretary of Defense Steuart L. Pittman. In the role, he supported the creation of "The President's Program for National Survival" and coordinated support to localities for the construction of fallout shelters. The office was abolished in 1964. In April 1964, Durkee was appointed by President Lyndon B. Johnson to serve as the second director of the Office of Civil Defense, helping to coordinate U.S. civil defense strategy during the Cold War.

=== Radio Free Europe ===
In 1967, he became the president of the National Committee for a Free Europe and Radio Free Europe. The national committee was an anti-communist Central Intelligence Agency (CIA) front organization which worked for the spreading of NATO influence in Eastern Europe and to covertly destabilize Soviet Bloc countries.

In 1971, Durkee testified before the Senate Foreign Affairs Committee regarding the funding and operations of Radio Free Europe. Durkee's testimony was part of a broader discussion on transitioning the funding of these radios to an open and congressionally approved process. The hearings led to legislative efforts to authorize public funding for Radio Free Europe, aiming to bring their financial support under direct congressional oversight. This shift was intended to enhance transparency and align the operations of these organizations with U.S. public diplomacy objectives during the Cold War.

Durkee resigned as president of Radio Free Europe in June 1975, to support the pending merger of Radio Free Europe with Radio Liberty. After his resignation, he supported the organization's consolidation efforts and was tasked with making recommendations for the future of European operations.

== Later life ==
After retiring from public service, he returned to the private sector, where he returned to practicing law. He also served as a member of the Council on Foreign Relations.

== Death ==
Durkee died of arteriosclerosis in 1982 at the age of 63. He is interred at Rose Hills Memorial Park.

== Honors ==
In 1965, Durkee received the Department of Defense Distinguished Civilian Service Award, the highest civilian award given by the U.S. Department of Defense.

== Works ==
- Civil Defense-The Military Support Role, 1964
- Civil Defense, 1965

== In popular culture ==
Durkee and his fellow members of the "Five Yanks" are the subject of Rachel S. Cox's 2012 non-fiction book, Into Dust and Fire: Five Young Americans Who Went First to Fight the Nazi Army, which chronicles the full story of these men. The book provides a narrative of their early lives, the decision to volunteer, and their experiences in combat with the British Eighth Army, drawing heavily on their personal correspondence and diaries. Into Dust and Fire brought the Five Yanks' story to a broad audience.

== See also ==
- The Five Yanks
