= Chester C. Bolton =

American politician

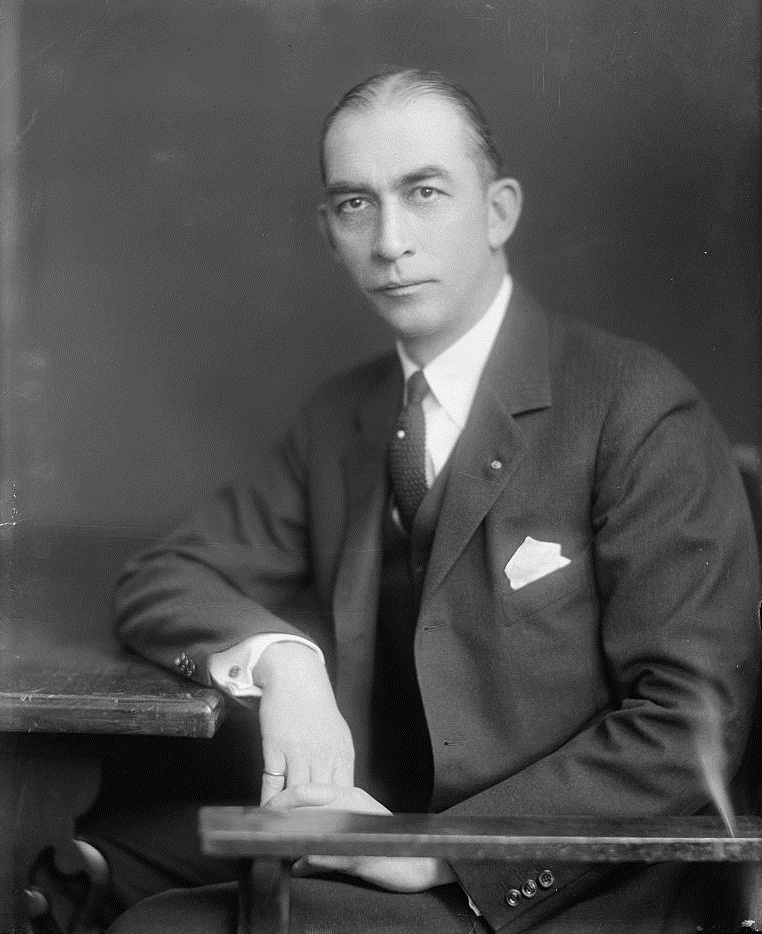

Member of the U.S. House of Representatives from Ohio's 22nd district
- In office March 4, 1929 – January 3, 1937
- Preceded by: Theodore E. Burton
- Succeeded by: Anthony A. Fleger
- In office January 3, 1939 – October 29, 1939
- Preceded by: Anthony A. Fleger
- Succeeded by: Frances P. Bolton

Member of the Ohio Senate
- In office 1923–1928

Personal details
- Born: Chester Castle Bolton; September 5, 1882 Cleveland, Ohio, U.S.
- Died: October 29, 1939 (aged 57) Cleveland, Ohio, U.S.
- Resting place: Lake View Cemetery
- Party: Republican
- Spouse: Frances Bingham (m. 1907)
- Children: 4, including Charles and Oliver
- Education: Harvard University

Chester Castle Bolton (September 5, 1882 – October 29, 1939) was an American lawyer and World War I veteran who served as a U.S. representative from Ohio. He served four consecutive terms from 1929 to 1937. He was elected to a fifth term in 1938, but he died before completing the term.

He was the husband of Frances P. Bolton, who succeeded him in Congress, and the father of Oliver P. Bolton. Frances and Oliver Bolton would themselves become the first mother and son to serve simultaneously in Congress.

== Life and career ==
Born in Cleveland, Ohio, Bolton attended the city's public schools. He graduated from the University School in Cleveland in 1901, and from Harvard University in 1905, where he was a member of the Delphic Club.

Chester Castle Bolton and Frances Payne Bingham Bolton were married in 1907. They had 4 children, Charles B. Bolton, Oliver Payne, Kenyon C., and Elizabeth Bolton.

=== Early career ===
Bolton was a business industrialist in the steel industry in Cleveland from 1905 to 1917. He served as member of the Ohio National Guard from 1905 to 1915.

World War I

Bolton was commissioned as a captain in the Reserve Corps, and then was ordered into active service in March 1917, in World War I. He was detailed first to the War Industries Board, and then served as aide to the Assistant Secretary of War. He was transferred to the General Staff in 1917. He was promoted to the rank of lieutenant colonel and detailed to the One Hundred and First Division as Assistant Chief of Staff, and was discharged in December 1918.

He returned to Cleveland, Ohio, and served as a director of several large business corporations, and also engaged in raising and breeding a renowned Guernsey cattle herd at Franchester Farms, on the Bolton's 65 acre family estate 'Franchester Place' in Lyndhurst, Ohio.

=== Politics ===
He served as member of the Lyndhurst Village Council from 1918 to 1921.

Bolton served in the Ohio State Senate during 1923–1928, and served as its president pro tempore in 1927 and 1928.

He served as delegate to the Republican National Convention in 1928.

Bolton was elected as a Republican congressman representing Ohio's 22nd congressional district to the Seventy-first and to the three succeeding Congresses, serving from 1929 until 1937. He served as chairman of the Republican Congressional Campaign Committee in 1934 and 1936.

He was an unsuccessful candidate for reelection as congressperson in 1936 to the Seventy-fifth Congress.

Bolton was elected to the Seventy-sixth Congress, again representing the 22nd district, serving from January 3, 1939, until his death in October 1939. His wife, Frances P. Bolton, was elected to serve out his term and was repeatedly reelected by the 22nd District through the late 1960s, serving for 29 years.

== Death and burial ==
Chester C. Bolton died on October 29, 1939, in Cleveland. He was interred in Lake View Cemetery. Oliver P. Bolton, his son, was interred there in 1972. Frances P. Bolton, his wife, was interred there in 1977.

== See also ==
- List of members of the United States Congress who died in office (1900–1949)

== Sources ==
- United States Congress. "Chester C. Bolton (id: B000606)". Biographical Directory of the United States Congress.

U.S. House of Representatives
Preceded by Theodore E. Burton	Member of the U.S. House of Representatives from Ohio's 22nd congressional district 1929-1937	Succeeded by Anthony A. Fleger
Preceded by Anthony A. Fleger	Member of the U.S. House of Representatives from Ohio's 22nd congressional district 1939	Succeeded by Frances P. Bolton
