= Charles G. Bolté =

American diplomat, author, and activist (1920 – 1994)

Charles Guy Bolté
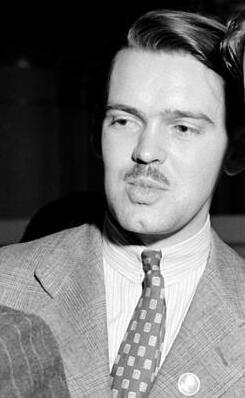
- Bolté in 1945

1st National Chairman of the American Veterans Committee
- In office 1944–1947
- Preceded by: Office established
- Succeeded by: Chat Paterson

Consultative Delegate to the United Nations Conference on International Organization
- In office March 20, 1945 – June 26, 1945
- President: Franklin D. Roosevelt; Harry S. Truman

Personal details
- Born: January 19, 1920 Manhattan, New York, U.S.
- Died: March 7, 1994 (aged 74) Augusta, Maine, U.S.
- Children: 3
- Education: Dartmouth College; University of Oxford
- Occupation: Vice President, Viking Press Executive Secretary, American Book Publishers Council Vice President, Carnegie Endowment for International Peace
- Known for: De facto leader, the "Five Yanks"

Military service
- Branch/service: British Army
- Years of service: 1941 – 1943
- Rank: Second Lieutenant
- Unit: King's Royal Rifle Corps
- Battles/wars: World War II: Second Battle of El Alamein

Charles Guy "Chuck" Bolté (January 19, 1920 – March 7, 1994) was an American diplomat, author, and activist who was an infantryman and de facto leader of the "Five Yanks" during World War II. He went on to serve as a consultative delegate to the United Nations Conference on International Organization, and as the founder and first national chairman of the American Veterans Committee.

== Early life and education ==
Charles Guy Bolté was born on January 19, 1920, in Manhattan.

He graduated from Dartmouth College in 1941 and was a Rhodes Scholar. While a student, he was the editorial chairman of The Dartmouth.

While still an undergraduate in April 1941, Bolté received national attention by publishing an open letter to President Franklin D. Roosevelt headlined "Now we have waited long enough," imploring the U.S. to join the fight against Hitler. This impassioned plea, printed on the front page of the Dartmouth student newspaper, was reprinted in papers across the country and even read into the Congressional Record by U.S. Senator William H. Smathers. Bolté's outspoken interventionism reflected his conviction that America could not stand aside.

== World War II service ==
During the early years of World War II—before the United States entered the conflict—Bolté was one of five young Americans who volunteered to fight for Britain against Nazi Germany, a group that was referred to as the "Five Yanks."

In May 1941, more than six months before the attack on Pearl Harbor, Bolté enlisted in the British Army, effectively becoming one of the first American ground troops to fight the Nazi army in World War II. He received officers' training in England and was commissioned as a second lieutenant in the King's Royal Rifle Corps. Along with the other four American men, Bolté deployed as a platoon leader with the British Eighth Army in North Africa. At the Second Battle of El Alamein in October 1942, he led a motor platoon into combat and was severely wounded during the fierce engagements. A shell blast mangled his right leg. After a month of treatment, doctors amputated the leg near the hip to save his life. Bolté was invalided back to the United States in June 1943, walking with an artificial leg.

== Later life ==
After returning to the United States, Bolté got married and began working in veteran's advocacy.

Bolté became the founding national chairman of the American Veterans Committee (AVC), a progressive, racially integrated veterans' organization whose motto was "Citizens first, veterans second." As the AVC's national chairman and spokesman in the late 1940s, he campaigned for veterans' benefits, civil rights, and world peace, arguing that the ideals for which the war was fought should shape the post-war world. In 1944, he was a guest of President Franklin D. Roosevelt at the White House. Bolté was a frequent newspaper columnist and testified to the U.S. Congress on numerous occasions.

When the new G.I. Bill was enacted in 1944, Bolté wrote that federal agencies were consistently discriminating in their implementation of the law, "as though the legislation were earmarked 'For White Veterans Only'".

In the late 1940s, he was a senior advisor to the United States Mission to the United Nations, attendee of the UN San Francisco Conference, and served as a consultant in the creation of the Charter of the United Nations. In 1946, Bolté supported the establishment of the National Commission on Higher Education and corresponded with President Harry S. Truman regarding non-discrimination and affirmative action. He stepped down as national chairman of the AVC in 1947.

In the 1950s, Bolté began working in publishing (including as an editor and later executive vice president at Viking Press, and executive secretary of the American Book Publishers Council), then worked as a director at the American Civil Liberties Union, and later worked at the Carnegie Endowment for International Peace. He retired from the Carnegie Endowment in 1972 to become a freelance writer.

== Death ==
Bolté died on March 7, 1994, at a medical center in Augusta, Maine.

== Works ==
- Letter to President Roosevelt, 1941
- The New Veteran, 1945
- This is the Face of War, 1945
- Our Negro Veterans (co-written with Louis Harris), 1946
- We're on our Own (published in The Atlantic), 1947
- The Big Question, 1947
- Security Through Book Burning, 1955
- The Price of Peace: A Plan for Disarmament, 1956

== In popular culture ==
A featured article of Bolte was published in TIME Magazine on December 10, 1945.

Bolté and his fellow members of the "Five Yanks" are the subject of Rachel S. Cox's 2012 non-fiction book, Into Dust and Fire: Five Young Americans Who Went First to Fight the Nazi Army, which chronicles the full story of these men. The book provides a narrative of their early lives, the decision to volunteer, and their experiences in combat with the British Eighth Army, drawing heavily on their personal correspondence and diaries. Into Dust and Fire brought the Five Yanks' story to a broad audience.

== See also ==
- The Five Yanks
