= Joseph J. Nahra =

American judge (1927–2022)

Joseph J. Nahra (March 20, 1927 – February 27, 2022) was an American lawyer and long-serving judge in Ohio, whose service included sitting by designation on cases before the Supreme Court of Ohio.

Raised in Cleveland, Ohio, in a family of Lebanese descent, Nahra served in the United States Army, and received a B.A. from Case Western Reserve University in 1949, followed by a J.D. from Harvard Law School in 1952. He entered the private practice of law, and held several offices in the American Lebanese Syrian Associated Charities. In 1969 he was nominated to the Cuyahoga County Common Pleas Court, to which he was elected in 1970, serving there until 1977. In his final year on the court, he presided over the trial of Owen and Martin Kilbane, "two brothers convicted of orchestrating the murder of a former Euclid judge's wife".

Nahra became a probate judge in 1977. He was the Republican nominee for the 1980 United States House of Representatives election for Ohio's 22nd congressional district. Nahra lost the election to Dennis E. Eckart, but had the best showing for a Republican candidate in that district in over a decade. In 1982, he became a judge of the Ohio 8th District Court of Appeals, where he remained for 17 years.

In May 1990, Nahra was one of three appellate judges named to sit by designation on the Supreme Court of Ohio, to hear an appeal of a criminal conviction of bank officials charged with making unauthorized transfers of state funds. Nahra again sat by designation on the supreme court in a 1992 case in which the court considered an appeal of a ruling by Ohio Secretary of State Bob Taft denying a request by Hamilton County, Ohio, Republican Party officials to hold a special congressional primary. Ohio Chief Justice Thomas J. Moyer had recused himself from consideration of the matter.

He married Barbara, with whom he had three sons and a daughter. He died in Cleveland, at the age of 94.
