= Anthony A. Fleger =

American politician

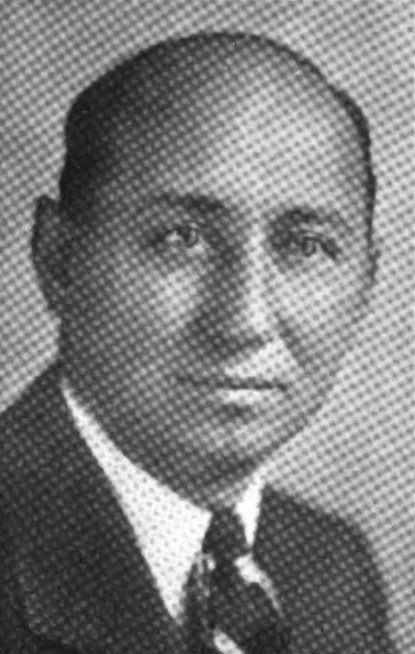
- Fleger, c. 1937

Member of the U.S. House of Representatives from Ohio's 22nd district
- In office January 3, 1937 – January 3, 1939
- Preceded by: Chester C. Bolton
- Succeeded by: Chester C. Bolton

Member of the Ohio House of Representatives
- In office January 1, 1933 – December 31, 1933

Mayor of Parma, Ohio
- In office January 1, 1934 – December 31, 1935
- Preceded by: Frank D. Johnson
- Succeeded by: Roland E. Reichert

Personal details
- Born: October 21, 1900 Austria-Hungary
- Died: July 16, 1963 (aged 62) Alexandria, Virginia, U.S.
- Party: Democratic
- Spouse: Mary Nemec
- Children: 2
- Education: John Marshall School of Law
- Occupation: Lawyer; politician

Anthony Alfred Fleger (October 21, 1900 – July 16, 1963) was a U.S. representative from Ohio.

== Life and career ==
Born in Austria-Hungary, in 1903 Fleger immigrated to the United States with his parents, who settled in Cleveland, Ohio. He attended the public schools and graduated from the John Marshall School of Law, Cleveland, Ohio, in 1926. Fleger was admitted to the bar the same year and commenced practice in Cleveland, Ohio. He later moved to Parma, Ohio, where he served as Justice of the Peace from 1930 to 1932.

He married Mary Nemec, with whom he had two children, Corinne and Donald.

Fleger was elected a member of the Ohio House of Representatives in 1932 and served from January 1, 1933, to December 31, 1933, when he resigned, having been elected mayor of Parma. He served as mayor from January 1, 1934, to December 31, 1935.

Fleger was elected as a Democrat to the 75th United States Congress (January 3, 1937 – January 3, 1939). He was an unsuccessful candidate for reelection in 1938 to the Seventy-sixth Congress and for election in 1940 to the Seventy-seventh Congress and resumed the practice of law in Cleveland, Ohio. Fleger served as special assistant to the Attorney General, Washington, D.C., from March 3, 1941, to July 9, 1950, and as an attorney in the Department of Justice from July 10, 1950, to May 9, 1953. He engaged in the practice of law in Washington, D.C., and resided in Oxon Hill, Maryland. He died in Alexandria (Virginia) Hospital July 16, 1963. He was interred in Holy Cross Cemetery (Brook Park, Ohio), Brook Park, Ohio.

== Sources ==
- United States Congress. "Anthony A. Fleger (id: F000195)". Biographical Directory of the United States Congress.

U.S. House of Representatives
| Preceded by Chester C. Bolton | Member of the U.S. House of Representatives from Ohio's 22nd congressional district 1937-1939 | Succeeded by Chester C. Bolton |
