= Frances P. Bolton =

American politician (1885–1977)

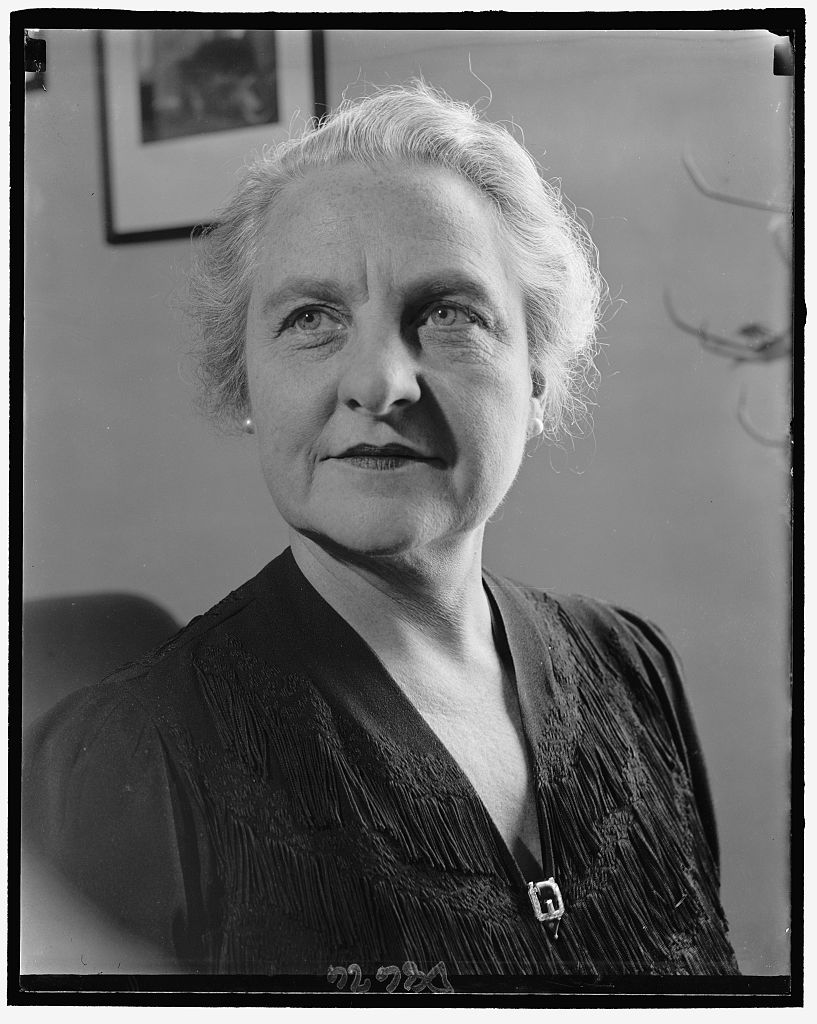

Member of the U.S. House of Representatives from Ohio's 22nd district
- In office February 27, 1940 – January 3, 1969
- Preceded by: Chester C. Bolton
- Succeeded by: Charles Vanik

Personal details
- Born: Frances Payne Bingham; March 29, 1885 Cleveland, Ohio, U.S.
- Died: March 9, 1977 (aged 91) Lyndhurst, Ohio, U.S.
- Resting place: Lake View Cemetery
- Party: Republican
- Spouse: Chester C. Bolton (m. 1907; died 1939)
- Relations: Harry Bingham (brother); Flora Payne (aunt); Nathan P. Payne (uncle); Oliver Hazard Payne (uncle); Henry B. Payne (grandfather)
- Children: 4, including Charles and Oliver
- Parent(s): Charles William Bingham; Mary Perry Payne Bingham

Frances Payne Bolton (née Bingham; March 29, 1885 – March 9, 1977) was an American politician from the Republican Party. She served in the United States House of Representatives, and was the first woman elected to Congress from Ohio.

In the late 1930s, Bolton took an isolationist position on foreign policy, opposing the Selective Service Act in 1940 which introduced the draft, and opposing Lend-Lease in 1941. During the war she called for desegregation of the military nursing units, which were all-white and all-female.

In 1947 she sponsored a long-range bill for nursing education, but it did not pass. When the draft was resumed after the war, Bolton strongly advocated for the conscription of women. Pointing to their prominent role during the war, she said it was vitally important that women continued to play these roles. She saw no threat to marriage, and argued that women in military service would develop their character and skills, thus enhancing their role in the family. As a member of the House Foreign Affairs Committee, Bolton supported the United Nations, especially UNICEF, and supported the independence of African colonies.

== Early life ==
She was born on March 29, 1885, in Cleveland, Ohio, as Frances Payne Bingham. She was the daughter of Charles William Bingham (1846–1929) and Mary Perry (née Payne) Bingham (1854–1898). Her siblings included Oliver Perry Bingham, William H. Bingham, Elizabeth Beardsley (née Bingham) Blossom, and Henry Payne Bingham.

Among her maternal family members was uncle Nathan P. Payne (the former mayor of Cleveland), Oliver Hazard Payne (who worked for Cleveland based Standard Oil and was a trustee for the Standard Oil Trust), and aunt Flora Payne (the wife of U.S. Secretary of the Navy William Collins Whitney). Her maternal grandfather was wealthy U.S. Senator Henry B. Payne.

She was educated at private schools in Cleveland, New York City, and in Paris.

== Congress ==
Active in public health, nursing education, and other social service, educational, and philanthropic work, she succeeded her husband, Chester C. Bolton, in office a few months after his death in 1939. Upon election to the remainder of her late husband's term, Bolton refused the customary widow's allowance comprising the remainder of the salary her late husband would have collected had he served out his term. She represented the 22nd District, which mostly consisted of Cleveland's eastern suburbs. Bolton served an additional fourteen terms, serving alongside her son, Oliver P. Bolton, for three of those terms. She and Oliver appeared on What's My Line? as the only mother-son pair serving in Congress at the same time. It was reported that when he voted against her, she once stage-whispered, "That's my adopted son."

A confidential 1943 analysis of the House Foreign Affairs Committee by Isaiah Berlin for the British Foreign Office described Bolton as

A quiet and moderately capable member of the committee, who, while not one of the active Opposition Four, is likely to be suspicious of any New Deal internationalism. Her record before Pearl Harbor was Isolationist. Nationalist rather than internationalist in outlook, at any rate, at present.

Serving on the House Foreign Affairs Committee, Bolton called Secretary of State John Foster Dulles in May 1954 after the fall of the French base at Dien Bien Phu, urging him to invite nurse Genevieve de Galard to the United States. When Galard arrived in July, Bolton described her as a "symbol of heroic femininity in the free world". After receiving the Presidential Medal of Freedom, Galard was received at a dinner for three hundred in Congresswoman Bolton's home district of Cleveland while on a tour of the country.

=== Civil rights ===
Bolton voted in favor of the Civil Rights Acts of 1957, 1960, 1964, and 1968, and the Voting Rights Act of 1965.

=== House Foreign Affairs Committee ===
In 1955, she became the first American woman member of Congress to head an international delegation, using her own resources to fund it. As a member of the House Foreign Affairs Committee's Subcommittee on Africa, she felt it was her responsibility to visit as much of Africa as possible. Arriving in Senegal on September 1, she spent the next six weeks crisscrossing the continent by plane, train, boat, and car. Her important stops included Liberia, Ghana (then still known as the Gold Coast), the Belgian Congo, Northern Rhodesia (now Zambia), Southern Rhodesia (now Zimbabwe), South Africa, and Ethiopia. She met with leading nationalists such as Kwame Nkrumah, politicians such as Haile Selassie, and leading women, such as the Queen Mother of the Tutsis. She also spent much of her trip visiting schools, talking with the youth, and meeting with women from all walks of life in markets or clinics. As someone with a lifelong interest in education and health care, she prioritized these issues during her African travels.

When she returned to the United States, she submitted a report to Congress. One of her recommendations was that Congress should create a new State Department Bureau for African Affairs to be overseen by a new assistant secretary of state for African affairs. Congress created the new bureau in 1958. In addition to sharing information about her trip with Congress through her official report, Bolton also made an effort to enlighten the American people about the diversity of the African continent by creating a film about her trip, entitled Africa: Giant With a Future, 1955. This has been made available on DVD by the National Archives. Bolton's trip helped to begin the process of opening doors for women to play a major role in U.S. foreign relations.

One of Bolton's most lasting achievements was her sponsoring of legislation to purchase property across the Potomac River from Mount Vernon, the home of George Washington. This prevented commercialization of the area and preserved its appearance as it was when Washington lived there.

Bolton was regarded as having a phenomenal relationship with her constituents of Italian-American heritage and was known for mailing government child-care pamphlets to homes where new babies had been born. The nursing school at Case Western Reserve University is named in her honor for her accomplishments and generosity in the field of public nursing.

=== Later life ===
After rising to become ranking minority member of the House Foreign Affairs Committee, Bolton was defeated in a bid for a sixteenth term in 1968 by Charles Vanik. She was, until Louise Slaughter's continued service in 2012, the oldest woman to serve in the House of Representatives. Bolton retired to her family home, Franchester (named for herself and her late husband), in Lyndhurst, Ohio.

== Personal life ==
In 1907, Frances Payne Bingham married Chester Castle Bolton (1882–1939). Together, they were the parents of four children:

- Charles Bingham Bolton (1909–1976), a dentist who developed the "Bolton Standards of Craniofacial Growth".
- Kenyon Castle Bolton (1912–1983), a philanthropist and patron of the arts who married Mary Idelle Peters of Lancaster, Ohio.
- Oliver Payne Bolton (1917–1972), who also served in the U.S. House of Representatives.
- Elizabeth Bolton (1919–1919), who died in infancy.

== Death and burial ==
She died in Lyndhurst, Ohio, on March 9, 1977, and was interred at Lake View Cemetery in Cleveland.

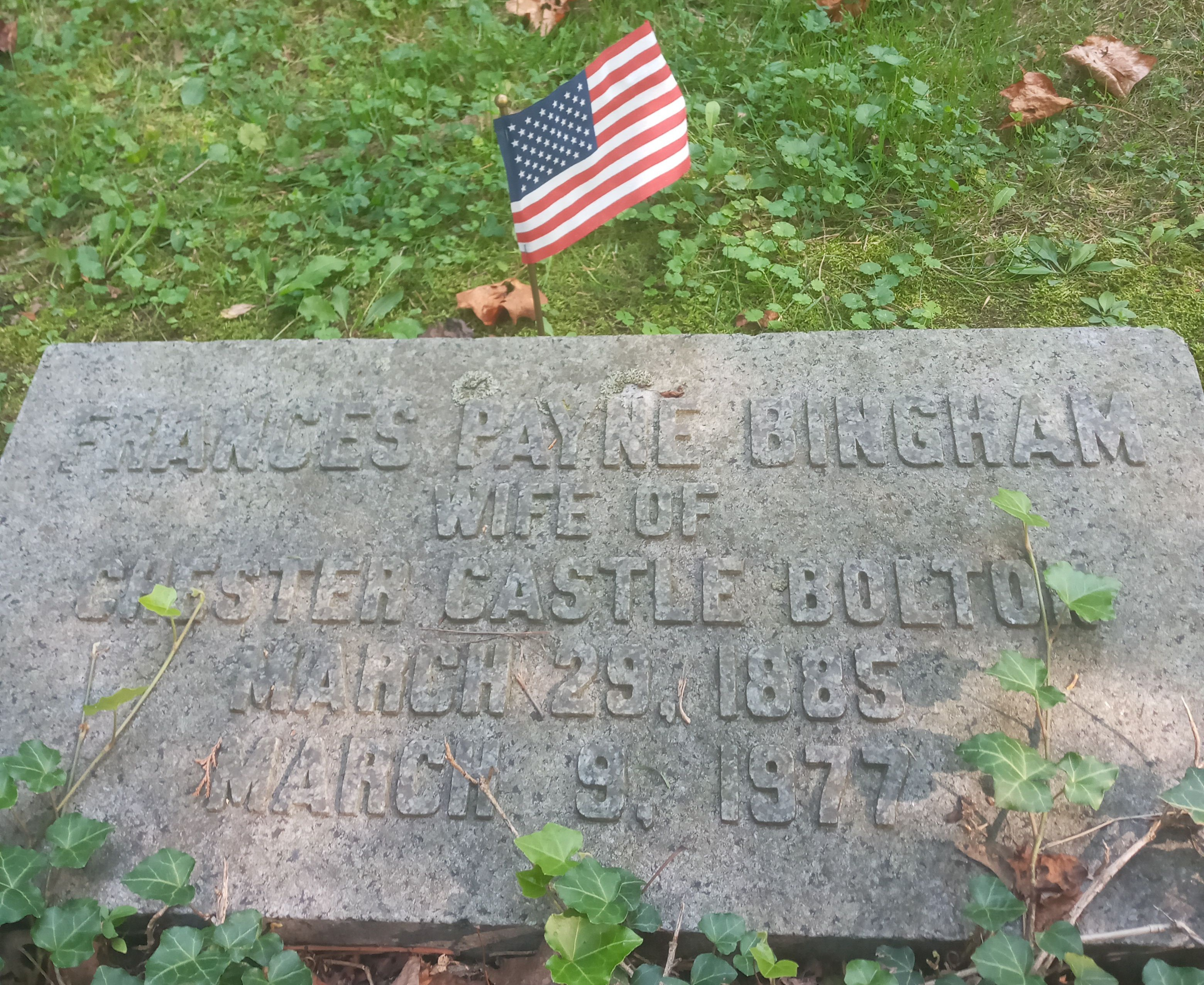
The gravesite of Congresswoman Bolton

=== Legacy ===
She was a devotee of yoga. The Bolton Fellowship supports research in parapsychology.

Bolton and her husband donated land adjacent to their estate in 1922 to create the campus of Hawken School in Lyndhurst, Ohio. Her sons attended the private country day school.

Her papers are held at the Western Reserve Historical Society.

The school of nursing at Case Western Reserve University in Cleveland is named Frances Payne Bolton School of Nursing in her honor.

== See also ==
- Women in the United States House of Representatives

== Sources ==
U.S. House of Representatives
Preceded by Chester Bolton	Member of the U.S. House of Representatives from Ohio's 22nd congressional district 1940–1969	Succeeded by Charles Vanik
