= Heyward Cutting =

American architect and curator (1921 – 2012)

Personal details
- Born: Heyward Cutting Jr. December 3, 1921 New York City, U.S.
- Died: March 18, 2012 (aged 90) Concord, Massachusetts, U.S.
- Relations: Francis B. Cutting (great-grandfather)
- Children: 4
- Education: Eton College; Harvard University; Chicago Institute of Design
- Known for: Youngest member of the "Five Yanks"
- Occupation: Assistant Director, Museum of Fine Arts, Boston Vice president, Geometrics, Inc.

Military service
- Branch/service: British Army
- Years of service: 1941 – 1945
- Rank: Major
- Unit: King's Royal Rifle Corps; 1st Armoured Division
- Battles/wars: World War II: Second Battle of El Alamein

Heyward Cutting Jr. (December 3, 1921 – March 18, 2012) was an American architect and curator who was a British Army major and youngest member of the "Five Yanks" during World War II.

== Early life and education ==
Heyward Cutting Jr. was born on December 3, 1921 in New York City, the son of Heyward Cutting Sr. and Constance Cleveland Roberson. He was a member of a wealthy and prominent family. His paternal great-grandfather was Congressman and investor Francis B. Cutting. He was a descendent of U.S. Representative Henry Walter Livingston, Walter Livingston (the first Speaker of the New York State Assembly) and Cornelia Livingston (née Schuyler). He was also a descendant of Robert Livingston, the last Lord of Livingston Manor.

Cutting attended St. Bernard's School as a child. After his father's death in an automobile accident in 1926, Cutting's family moved to England to live with Iris Origo. Cutting then attended boarding school and later Eton College, where he graduated in 1939. After the outbreak of the war in Europe, Cutting's family moved back to the United States.

After returning home he enrolled in Harvard University, but in his sophomore year he found himself "anxious to rejoin" his British friends in their hour of peril. When Robert Cox (his Harvard classmate) and others invited him to enlist in the British Army, Cutting enthusiastically agreed despite his youth.

== World War II service ==
During the early years of World War II—before the United States entered the conflict—Cutting was one of five young Americans who volunteered to fight for Britain against Nazi Germany, a group that was referred to as the "Five Yanks."

In May 1941, more than six months before the attack on Pearl Harbor, Cutting enlisted in the British Army, effectively becoming one of the first American ground troops to fight the Nazi army in World War II. Cutting received officers' training in England and was commissioned as a second lieutenant in the King's Royal Rifle Corps at age 19.

Along with the other four American men, Cutting deployed as a platoon leader with the 1st Armoured Division of the British Eighth Army in North Africa. He was wounded during the intense combat of the Second Battle of El Alamein. His injuries required a long recovery period; he spent many months in hospitals and convalescent depots following El Alamein.

By the time he recuperated in late 1943, the North African campaign was over, so Cutting was reassigned to staff duties. He served at the Allied Forces HQ in Italy for the remainder of the war, contributing to planning and logistics for operations in the Mediterranean theater. Cutting was promoted to major and ultimately returned home to the United States in August 1945, after the Allied victory.

== Later life ==
After returning from Europe in 1945, Cutting spent several months in northern Alaska, where he lived with five Kivallirmiut families and documented their lives through a film project. Cutting then enrolled in the Chicago Institute of Design where he earned an architecture degree, studying directly under László Moholy-Nagy.

After graduation, Cutting became an architect and urban planner, forming a design partnership 'Chermayeff & Cutting' with Serge Chermayeff in the early 1950s. He later was a co-founder of a new architecture and industrial design firm, Geometrics, Inc., where he served as vice president and director. Cutting played a role in a number of notable designs and commissions, including the Cape Cod National Seashore, prototype structures for the Distant Early Warning Line, the dome of the Montreal Biosphere, the home of Edwin O'Connor, and the Wellesley College boathouse on Lake Waban.

Beginning in 1961, Cutting served as a trustee of the Museum of Fine Arts in Boston, and in 1968 he was appointed by the museum as Assistant Director for Administration, working alongside Perry T. Rathbone. After stepping down from the role in 1973, he was elected to a final term on the museum board, where he served for two years.

In 1976, Cutting was an invited guest of Queen Elizabeth II for a reception onboard the HMY Britannia during her visit to the United States.

== Personal life ==
Cutting was twice married and had three sons and one stepson. He is interred at the Memorial Garden at Trinity Episcopal Church in Concord. He was a longtime member of the Tavern Club, where he wrote a series of musical comedies. Cutting was a noted collector of art, sculpture, and literature, including works by Mark Rothko and Marino Marini.

== Death ==
Cutting died on March 18, 2012, at the age of 90. At the time of his death, he was the last surviving member of the Five Yanks.

== In popular culture ==
Cutting and his fellow members of the "Five Yanks" are the subject of Rachel S. Cox's 2012 non-fiction book, Into Dust and Fire: Five Young Americans Who Went First to Fight the Nazi Army, which chronicles the full story of these men. The book provides a narrative of their early lives, the decision to volunteer, and their experiences in combat with the British Eighth Army, drawing heavily on their personal correspondence and diaries. Into Dust and Fire brought the Five Yanks' story to a broad audience.

== See also ==
- The Five Yanks
