= Frances Payne Bolton School of Nursing =

Coordinates: 41°30′20″N 81°36′14″W

Case Western Reserve University Frances Payne Bolton School of Nursing
- Established: 1898
- Dean: Carol M. Musil
- Location: Cleveland, Ohio, U.S.
- Website: https://case.edu/nursing/

The Frances Payne Bolton School of Nursing is the nursing school of Case Western Reserve University in Cleveland, OH. The school is named in honor of Frances Payne Bolton, a former congresswoman from Cleveland's 22nd District.

== History ==
Originally known as the Lakeside Hospital Training School for Nursing, the school was founded in 1898. Kate Benedict Hanna Harvey (1871–1936), an heiress to the M. A. Hanna Company fortune and philanthropist, spearheaded its establishment. In honor and after endowment by Frances Payne Bolton, the school was renamed in 1935 to the Frances Payne Bolton School of Nursing.

Case Western Reserve created the world's first applied doctorate of nursing in 1979.

In 2019, the main offices were relocated into the Health Education Campus's Samson Pavilion, on the campus of Cleveland Clinic.

Marian K. Shaughnessy Nurse Leadership Academy was created in 2021, and is located on the Health Education Campus.

== Programs ==
The Frances Payne Bolton School of Nursing educates health care professionals. It offers undergraduate and graduate nursing programs, including:

- Bachelor of Science in Nursing (BSN)
- Graduate Entry (MN)
- Master of Science in Nursing (MSN)
- Doctor of Nursing Practice (DNP)
- Doctor of Philosophy in Nursing (PhD)
- Dual Doctorate DNP/PhD Program
