= 1908 Messina earthquake =

Earthquake in southern Italy

1908 Messina earthquake and tsunami
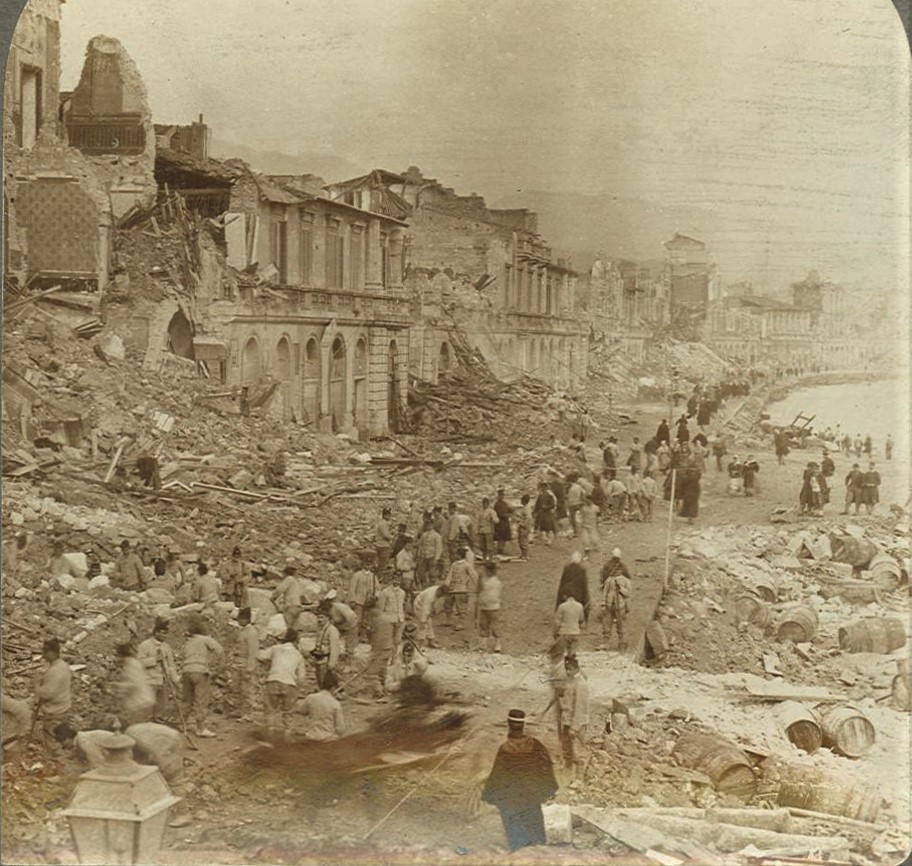
- Ruins of Messina after the earthquake and tsunami. Taken at the northern section of the Palazzata in front of the harbour

- Location within Italy
- UTC time: 1908-12-28 04:20:27
- ISC event: 16958009
- USGS-ANSS: ComCat
- Local date: 28 December 1908
- Local time: 5:20:27
- Duration: 37 seconds
- Magnitude: 7.1 M_{w}
- Depth: 5–6 mi (8–10 km)
- Epicenter: 38.15°N 15.68°E Strait of Messina
- Fault: Possibly blind normal fault underlying Strait of Messina; or according to findings in 2019, the Messina -Taormina Fault which runs offshore of eastern Sicily the entire length of the Strait
- Type: Dip-slip
- Areas affected: Sicily & Calabria, Kingdom of Italy
- Total damage: Tsunami waves, fires, landslides; Messina and Reggio Calabria almost destroyed
- Max. intensity: MMI XI (Extreme)
- Tsunami: Up to 12 m (39 ft)
- Landslides: Yes
- Aftershocks: 293
- Casualties: 120,000

A devastating earthquake occurred on 28 December 1908 in Sicily and Calabria, southern Italy, with a moment magnitude of 7.1 and a maximum Mercalli intensity of XI (Extreme). The epicentre was in the Strait of Messina which separates Sicily from the Italian mainland. The cities of Messina and Reggio Calabria were nearly destroyed and around 120,000 people died, making it the deadliest earthquake in the history of Europe.

== Cause of the earthquake ==
According to Italy's National Institute of Geophysics and Vulcanology, the earthquake was caused by a large, low-angle SE-dipping, blind normal fault, lying mainly offshore in the Strait of Messina, between plates. Its upper projection intersects the Earth's surface on the western side of the Strait, Sicily's coast. In 2019 researchers at Birkbeck, University of London, discovered the active fault responsible for the earthquake. The study, led by Marco Meschis, identified the fault as the previously mapped but little-studied Messina-Taormina Fault which lies off the Sicilian coast and runs the length of the Strait of Messina. The team used data from 1907–1908 to examine the pattern of uplifts and subsidence observed in the Messina and Calabria area which bore a strong resemblance to those resulting from other powerful earthquakes triggered by normal faults. After comparing the direction and size of movements on well-known faults with the surface movements seen in Messina and Calabria, the researchers identified the probable active fault which caused the catastrophic earthquake as well as the direction and size of the movements.

Italy sits along the boundary zone of the African plate, and this plate is pushing against the sea floor underneath Europe at a rate of 25 millimetres (0.98 inches) per year. This causes vertical displacement, which can cause earthquakes. The earthquake was recorded by 110 seismographic stations around the world, and was one of the first to be recorded by instruments.

The Strait of Messina is part of the regional tectonic feature known as the Calabrian Arc, an area of differential uplift deriving from the dynamics of the Ionian and South Tyrrhenian tectonic units, two of the lithosphere blocks of microplates recognized in the highly fragmented Italian portion of the Africa-Eurasia contact. Some of the strongest earthquakes of the last centuries occurred in the Calabrian Arc, such as the 1783 and 1905 Calabrian earthquakes, as well as the more catastrophic 1908 Messina earthquake.

Records indicate that considerable seismic activity occurred in the areas around the Strait of Messina for several months prior to 28 December; it increased in intensity beginning on 1 November. On 10 December, a magnitude 4 earthquake caused damage to a few buildings in Novara di Sicilia and Montalbano Elicona, both in the Province of Messina.

A total of 293 aftershocks took place between 28 December 1908 and 11 March 1909.

In 2008, it was proposed that the concurrent tsunami was not generated by the earthquake, but rather by a large undersea landslide it had triggered. The probable source of the tsunami was off Giardini Naxos (40 km south of Messina), on the Sicilian coast, where a large submarine landslide body with a headwall scarp was visible on a bathymetric map of the Ionian seafloor. Another study attributed the source of the tsunami to having been a landslide which took place off of north-eastern Sicily and southern Calabria, most likely offshore between San Leo and Bocale in Calabria.

== Earthquake ==
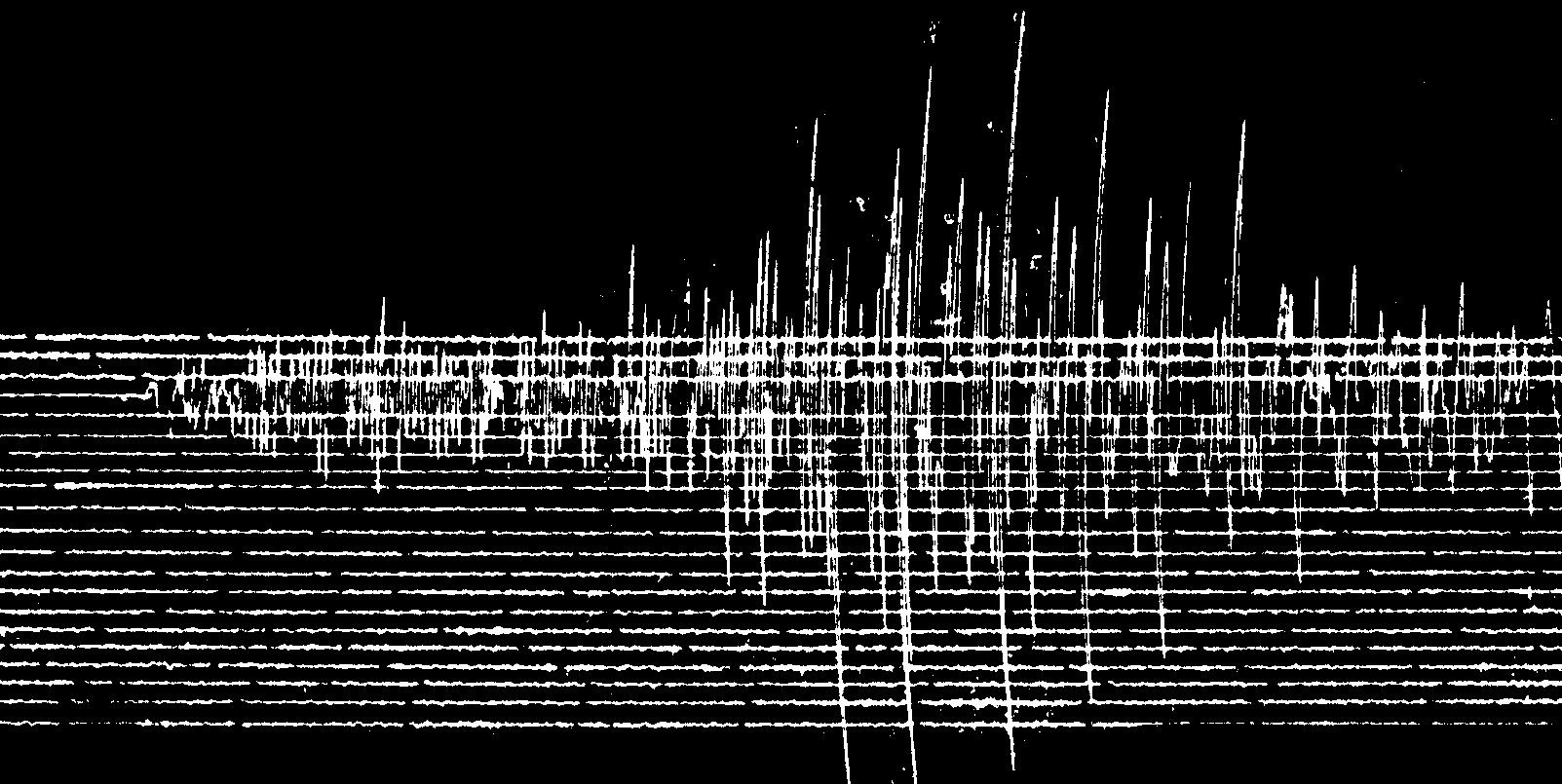
Messina earthquake seismogram

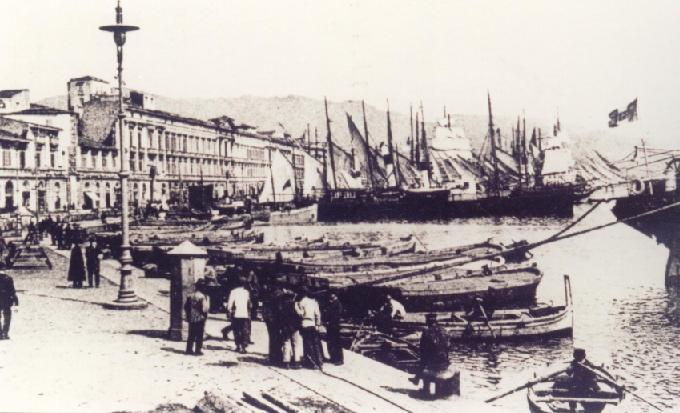
The port of Messina in c. 1900, before the earthquake and tsunami

On Monday, 28 December 1908, at 5:20:27 an earthquake of 7.1 on the moment magnitude scale occurred. Its epicentre was in the Strait of Messina which separates the busy Sicilian port city of Messina from Reggio Calabria on the Italian mainland. Its precise epicentre has been pinpointed in the northern Ionian Sea area close to the narrowest section of the Strait, the location of Messina. It had a depth of around 9 km (5.6 mi).

The earthquake almost levelled Messina. At least 91% of the structures in Messina were destroyed or irreparably damaged and 75,000 people were killed in the city and its suburbs. Reggio Calabria and other locations in Calabria also suffered heavy damage, with some 25,000 people killed. Reggio's historic centre was almost completely eradicated. The number of casualties is based on 1901 and 1911 census data. It was the most destructive earthquake in recorded history to strike Europe. The ground shook for 37 seconds, and the damage was widespread, with destruction felt over a 4,300 km^{2} (1,700 sq mi) area.

In Calabria, the ground shook violently from Scilla to south of Reggio, provoking landslides inland in the Reggio area and along the sea-cliff from Scilla to Bagnara. In the Calabrian commune of Palmi on the Tyrrhenian coast, there was devastation that left 600 dead. Damage was also inflicted along the eastern Sicilian coast, but only Messina was hit as badly as Calabria. The mesoseismal area was confined near the coast along a 1-to-4-kilometre-wide (0.6 to 2.5 mi) belt that shook Messina and the surrounding villages. Catania, the largest city in eastern Sicily, did not incur notable damage.

A young doctor who escaped with his life later recounted that "the profound silence was broken by an extraordinary noise like the bursting of a thousand bombs, followed by a rushing and torrential rain." Then he heard a "sinister whistling sound" which he likened to "a thousand red hot irons hissing in the water." Other survivors reported that there were three separate and different movements during the 37-second main shock: the first shaking backwards and forwards, the second thrusting violently upwards, with the third moving in a circular motion. Most accounts concur that it was the second upwards motion that caused the widespread destruction in Messina; the accompanying noise described as having been "exactly like that made by a fast train in a tunnel".

The elevated death toll was due to the fact that most people were asleep, and killed outright or buried alive in their beds, as their houses collapsed on top of them. Thousands were trapped under debris, and died from their injuries. One week before the earthquake, 160,000 inhabitants were counted in the entire Messina commune. On 28 December, Messina was even more crowded than usual, due to the number of overnight visitors from outlying areas who had come to the city to see a performance of Giuseppe Verdi's opera Aida, which had been staged the previous evening at the Vittorio Emanuele II theatre.

=== Tsunami ===
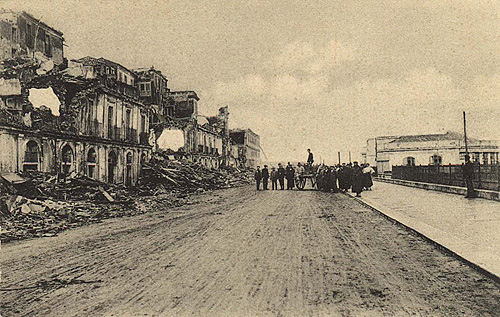
The devastated seafront of Reggio Calabria

About ten minutes after the earthquake, the sea on both sides of the Strait suddenly withdrew as a 12-meter (39-foot) tsunami swept in, and three waves struck nearby coasts. It struck hardest along the Calabrian coast and inundated Reggio Calabria after the sea had receded 70 metres (230 ft) from the shore. The entire Reggio seafront was destroyed and people who had gathered there perished. Nearby Villa San Giovanni was also badly hit. Along the coast between Lazzaro and Pellaro, houses and a railway bridge were washed away.

In Messina, the tsunami also caused devastation and death; many of the survivors of the earthquake had fled to the relative safety of the seafront to escape their collapsing houses. The second and third tsunami waves, coming in rapid succession and higher than the first, raced over the harbour, smashed boats docked at the pier, and broke parts of the sea wall. After engulfing the port and three city streets inland beyond the harbour, the waves swept away people, ships that had been anchored in the harbour, fishing boats and ferries, and inflicted further damage on the edifices within the zone which had remained standing after the shock.

The ships that were still attached to their moorings collided with one another but did not incur major damage. Afterwards, Messina harbour was filled with floating wreckage and the corpses of drowned people and animals. Towns and villages along the eastern coast of Sicily were assaulted by high waves which killed people and damaged boats and other property. Two hours later, the tsunami struck Malta, rushing into Marsamxett Harbour and damaging property in Msida. About 2,000 people were killed by the tsunami in Messina on the eastern coast of Sicily, and in Reggio Calabria and its coastal environs.

== Scale of destruction ==
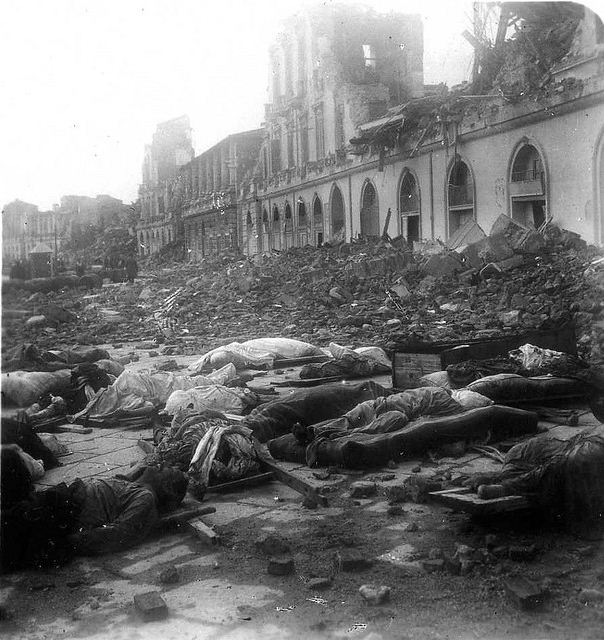
Victims' bodies lying outside the badly damaged and partially destroyed Palazzata in Corso Vittorio Emanuele which fronts the port of Messina

Messina lost almost half its population and the entire historical city centre was devastated, including its Norman cathedral, which had withstood previous earthquakes such as a severe one in 1783; only its perimeter walls and apses remained standing.

The Messina shoreline was irrevocably altered as large sections of the coast had sunk several feet into the sea. Houses, churches, palaces and monuments, military barracks, commercial, municipal and public buildings had all collapsed entirely or were severely damaged. Many structures were left as cracked shells: roofless, windowless and standing upright precariously. The Maurolico boarding school in Corso Cavour was pulverised, burying the students. A total of 348 railway workers were killed when the two railway stations crumbled.

The American consulate fronting the harbour was reduced to a pile of rubble; the British consulate sustained little outward damage (its flag still flew), but its interior was wrecked. American consul Arthur S. Cheney and his wife Laura were killed. The French consul and his children also died, while his wife escaped. Ethel Ogston, wife of the British vice-consul, died instantly after being struck by a falling balcony as she attempted to escape through the streets with her husband Alfred and her daughter, both of whom survived. Former US vice-consul Joseph Pierce, who was the Messina correspondent for the Associated Press, and his family were crushed to death when their damaged home in Via Porta Real Basso, close to the harbour, was brought down by the force of the waves created by the tsunami.

Italians who died included sculptor Gregorio Zappalà; the Chief Prosecutor (Procuratore Generale) of Messina Crescenzo Grillo; Giacomo Macrì, former rector of the University of Messina; politicians Nicola Petrina, Nicolò Fulci and Giovanni Noè; as well as local patriots of the Italian unification, members of the nobility, academia and literati. Socialist historian Gaetano Salvemini survived but lost his wife, five children and sister. The Questore (Head of Police) Paolo Caruso died in his office, killed by a fallen beam. Anglican priest and football pioneer Charles Bousfield Huleatt, along with his family and other players of the Messina Football Club, died. Composer Riccardo Casalaina and his wife perished alongside one another in their bed. Tenor Angelo Gamba, who had performed on stage in Aida on the evening before the earthquake, also died, together with his wife and two sons, when the Hotel Europa collapsed. The Hungarian soprano Paola Koraleck (who sang the role of Aida) was lying awake when the earthquake struck. She leapt from a window of the damaged Hotel Trinacria, breaking both arms in the fall.

The earthquake wrecked the commercial section along Messina's Corso Vittorio Emanuele that skirted the seafront. This included the elegant Palazzata, a long sequence of grand buildings that fronted the sickle-shaped harbour. The Palazzata had originally been built in baroque style in the seventeenth century, and was mainly the work of Simone Gullì. Most of the baroque buildings had been destroyed in the earthquake of 1783, and had been rebuilt in neo-classical style in the early nineteenth century. It was the imposing neo-classical Palazzata, with some of the surviving baroque buildings, that was badly damaged in 1908. The shaking was especially intense in the port area, resulting in the permanent displacement of the stone pavings in a "wave-like pattern". Damage was heaviest in the old historic centre and the low, level central and northern sections of the city, due to the soft sandy soil; it was less severe in the mountainous western part, as the structures were built on firmer terrain, such as the Gonzaga Fort, which was unscathed. The area between Cathedral Square and the 16th century Civic Hospital which fronted the Torrente Portalegni was obliterated; the adjacent Via Porta Imperiale was struck particularly hard on both sides. The Torrente Bocetta zone also received severe damage.

The 17th-century Real Cittadella, which guarded the harbour, was partially destroyed. Huge crevasses and fissures opened in the streets and these as well as the mounds of rubble, and falling masonry, hampered survivors who had fled from their razed homes to seek safety. Two of the main thoroughfares Via Garibaldi and Corso Cavour were rendered impassable by the hillocks of rubble and debris 5 metres (16 ft) in height. Families had become separated and a torrential downpour of rain that had begun only minutes before the earthquake added to the confusion, impeding visibility along with the darkness and thick clouds of dust. The great gas tanks at the northern end of the city blew up, entombing living survivors and the already dead. Fires broke out, caused by broken gas pipes, which added to the chaos and destruction. The ground continued to shake with repeated aftershocks causing remaining structures to topple down onto the ruins of demolished edifices killing and injuring rescuers and those who had survived the mainshock.

Survivors described having seen horribly disfigured bodies and injured people badly maimed and screaming for help. Cobbler Francesco Missiani and his family came upon two dying girls, both of whom had suffered appalling head and chest injuries. Processions of naked survivors carrying pictures of saints appeared in the streets. People searched with bare hands through the debris for trapped loved ones. Rescuers at the scene managed to save some people clinging precariously to gaping upper storeys, windows and teetering balconies by using ropes to pull them to safety. Similar scenes of destruction were replicated in Reggio Calabria. Its historical centre was eradicated and the monumental Aragonese Castle, one of the few edifices to have survived the 1783 earthquake, was badly damaged. With the exception of one mansion, all the structures in its principal thoroughfare Corso Garibaldi were destroyed including the Cathedral, municipal buildings and palazzi. Only about 50 houses remained standing in Reggio.

The civilian and military hospitals in Messina, and the civic hospital in Reggio Calabria all lay in ruins with nearly all the doctors and nurses dead. The injured in the two cities had no medical support or medicine until outside relief arrived and hospital tents were set up. Telegraph lines had been severed and railway lines mangled, making communication impossible. Most of Messina's officials were killed or gravely injured, along with almost the entire police force and soldiers of the garrison, who perished when their respective barracks collapsed. Many officers in the garrison survived, their accommodation being more substantial. Prisoners who had escaped death when the prison fell began looting property and even robbing corpses of their jewellery. In Reggio an estimated 1,800 convicts died when the prison was destroyed. Peasants from nearby rural villages joined the looters. Troops were soon sent to Messina and martial law was declared by General Feira Di Cossatto.

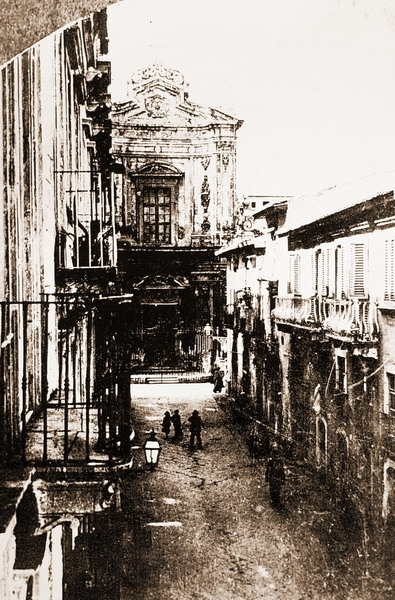
Via Santa Maria delle Trombe, a typical residential street in the populous zone near Via Monasteri a few years before the earthquake which obliterated the houses and destroyed the homonymous church

Rescuers searched through the ruins for weeks, and whole families were still being pulled out alive, days following the earthquake, but thousands remained buried beneath the rubble, their bodies never recovered. Buildings in Messina had not been constructed for earthquake resistance, having been built out of small stones and carelessly-applied mortar with heavy tiled roofs, ornamental cornices, unsupported cross beams and vulnerable foundations on soft soil. Many had four or five storeys. The most populous areas in the city were concentrated in and around Via dei Monasteri (today Via XXIV Maggio), Via Casa Pia (today Via Monsignor D'Arrigo) and Via Porta Imperiale; all of which were located in the historic city centre. In addition to the poorly constructed buildings, the widespread destruction in Messina and Reggio Calabria was due to the telluric movement having been so close to the surface.

== Relief efforts ==
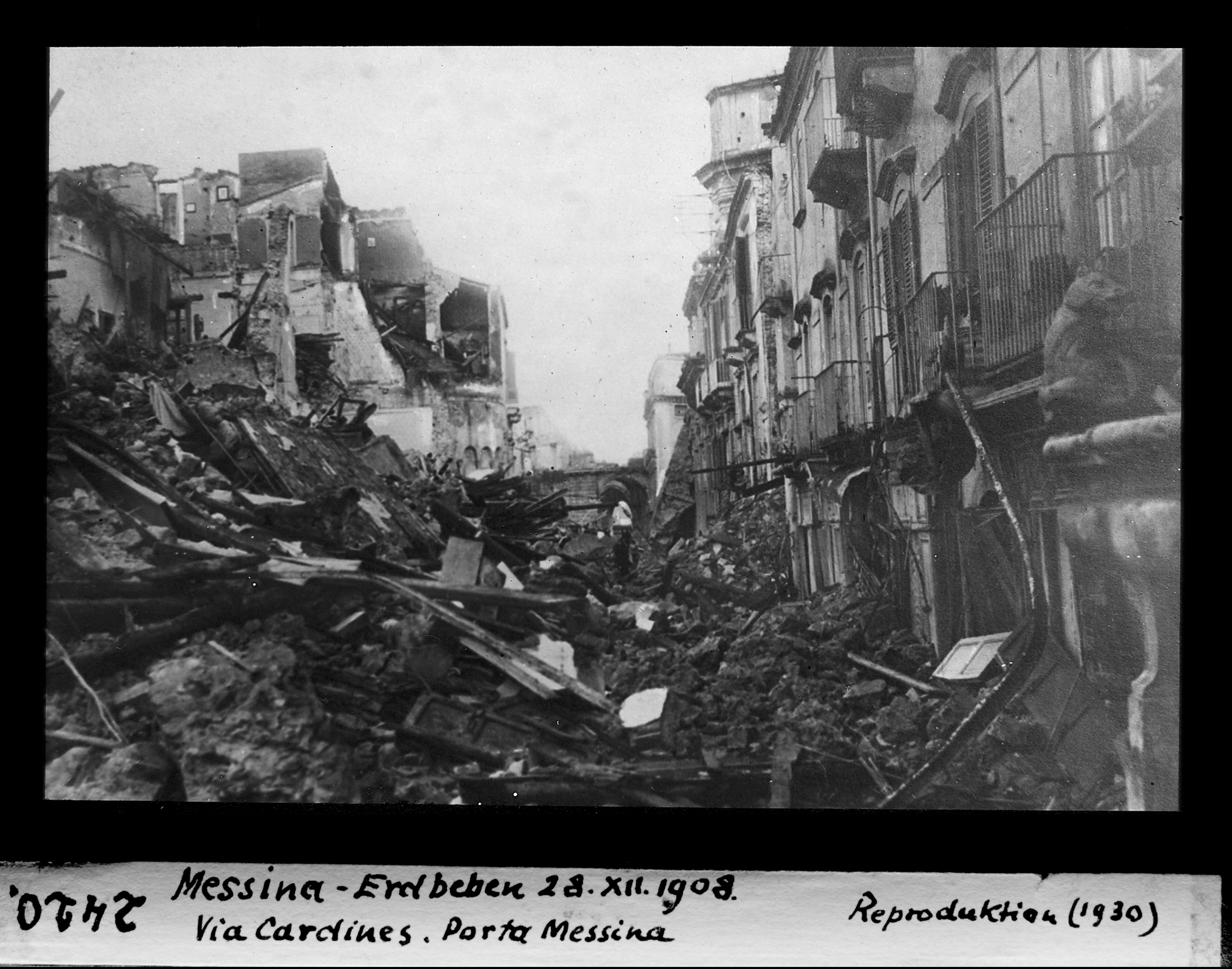
Rubble blocking Via Cardines. At the time it was one of Messina's principal thoroughfares

News of the disaster was carried to Prime Minister Giovanni Giolitti by Italian torpedo boats which set out from Messina to Nicotera, where the telegraph lines were still working, but that was not accomplished until midnight at the end of the day. Rail lines in the area had been destroyed, often along with the railway stations. Pope Pius X filled the Apostolic Palace with refugees.

The Italian navy and army responded and began searching, treating the injured, providing food and water, and evacuating refugees (as did every ship). Giolitti imposed martial law under the direction of General Francesco Mazza with all looters to be shot on sight, which occasionally extended to survivors foraging for food and searching through the rubble for trapped family members. King Victor Emmanuel III and Queen Elena arrived two days after the earthquake to assist the victims and survivors.

=== International response ===
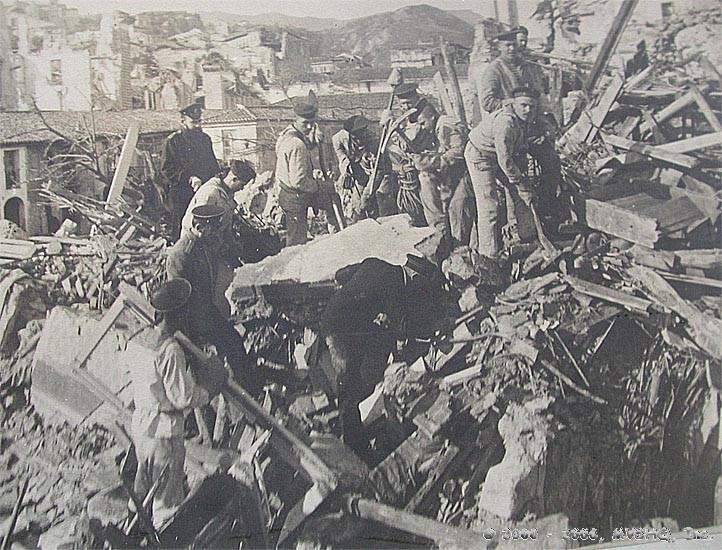
Russian sailors from the battleship "Slava" excavating the rubble for survivors in Via Idria near the ruined Civic Hospital

The disaster made headlines worldwide and international relief efforts were launched. With the help of the Red Cross and sailors of the Russian and British fleets, search and cleanup were expedited. The Russian battleships Tsesarevich, and Slava and the cruisers Admiral Makarov, and Bogatyr, British battleship Exmouth and the cruisers Euryalus, Minerva, and Sutlej were ordered to provide assistance; the SS Afonwen was in Messina harbour during the quake (anchored in 45 fathoms (82 m) of water, but there were only 30 fathoms (55 m) when she sailed full of refugees). The French battleships Justice and Vérité, and three torpedo boat destroyers were ordered to Messina. Two battleships of the U.S. Navy's Great White Fleet, USS Connecticut and Illinois, along with supply ships USS Celtic and USS Culgoa also delivered succor. The American supply vessels including the tender USS Yankton, buttressed with extra medical personnel and supplies from the battleship fleet, delivered supplies to help the refugees and remained on station giving medical aid. Other nations' ships also responded.

=== Commemoration ===
The King of Italy later awarded a commemorative medal for 1908 earthquake assistance, struck in gold, silver and bronze.

Several streets in Messina have been named after the Russian sailors, including Largo dei Marinai Russi. In 2012, a monument to the Russian sailors, designed by Pietro Kufferle in 1911, was installed in the city, and a bust of Emperor Nicholas II was opened in Taormina; a bust of Admiral Fyodor Ushakov was set up in 2013.

== Aftermath ==
=== Reconstruction ===
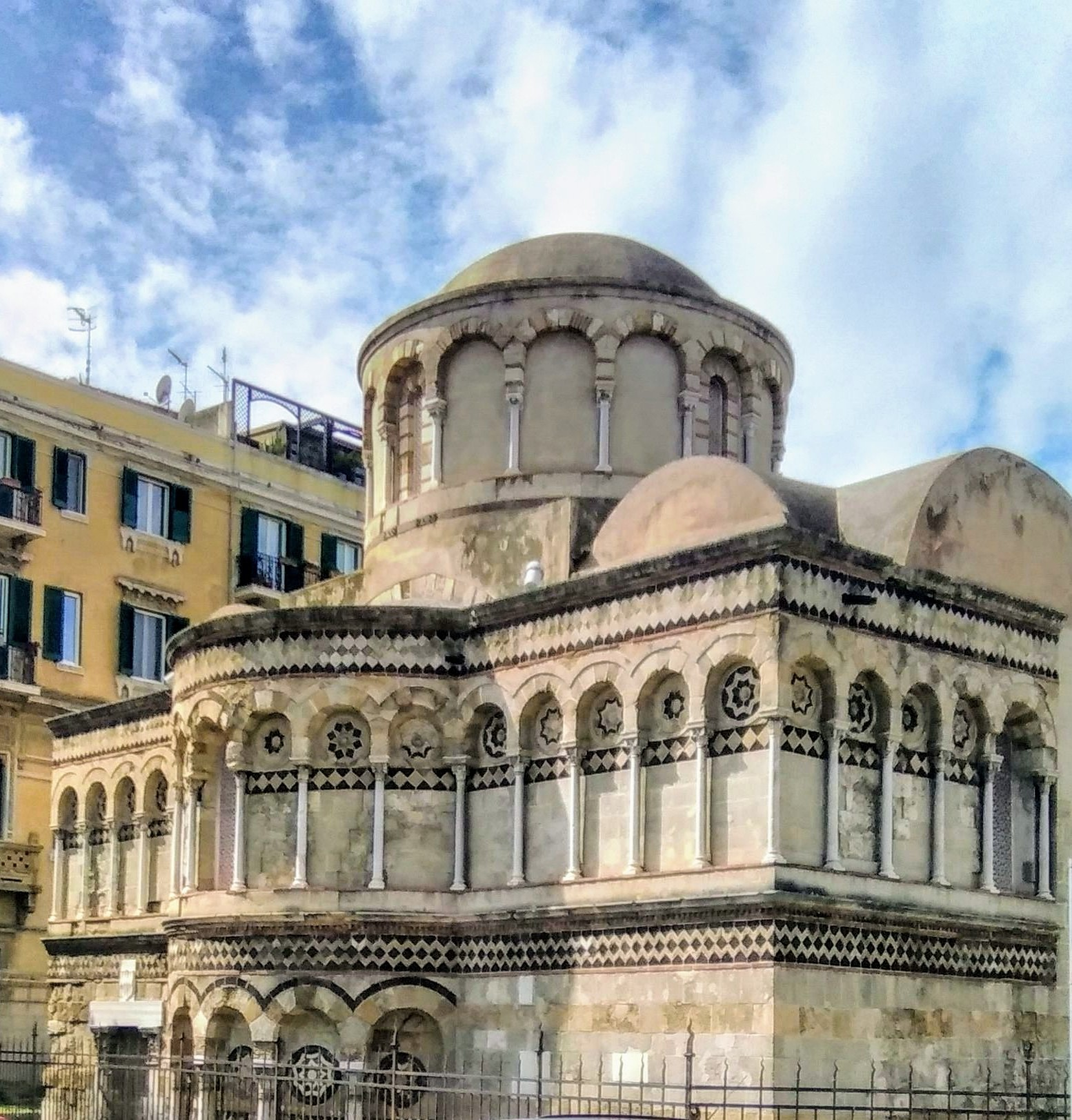
Church of the Santissima Annunziata dei Catalani, built in the 12th century, one of the few structures that survived the earthquake

When the reconstruction of Messina began from 1909, authorities mandated architecture able to withstand earthquakes of variable magnitude. Initially, a plan was adopted to demolish the remaining structures of Messina and to transfer the city and its port elsewhere in Sicily, but strong protests from the Messinesi led to the discarding of this suggestion.

A few structures survived the earthquake – they included the domed medieval Church of the Santissima Annunziata dei Catalani, the Gothic Santa Maria Alemanna church, the Byzantine San Tommaso Apostolo il Vecchio church, San Ranieri lighthouse, Forte del Santissimo Salvatore, the 18th century Palazzo Calapaj-d'Alcontres, Giovanni Montorsoli's Fountain of Neptune and the Barbera spinning mill (later converted to a museum to house the art treasures salvaged from the ruins). The Real Cittadella, Vittorio Emanuele theatre, sections of the Matagrifone castle and Monti di Pieta remained standing but sustained considerable damage. The 16th-century Church of Ringo in the fishermen's quarter of the same name along the northern Messina riviera withstood the shock and survives to date. The "Scalinata Santa Barbara", large sections of the Muro Carlo V and a number of 18th and 19th century houses in the ancient quarter of Tirone survived; additionally several houses in Via Fata Morgana and Via Giordano Bruno remained standing and are in use today. Although some of the dwellings (known as le mignuni in local dialect) located in the slum of Avignone also remained standing relatively intact, they have since been demolished. In Reggio Calabria the Palazzo Nesci was one of the few 19th-century structures to withstand the earthquake.

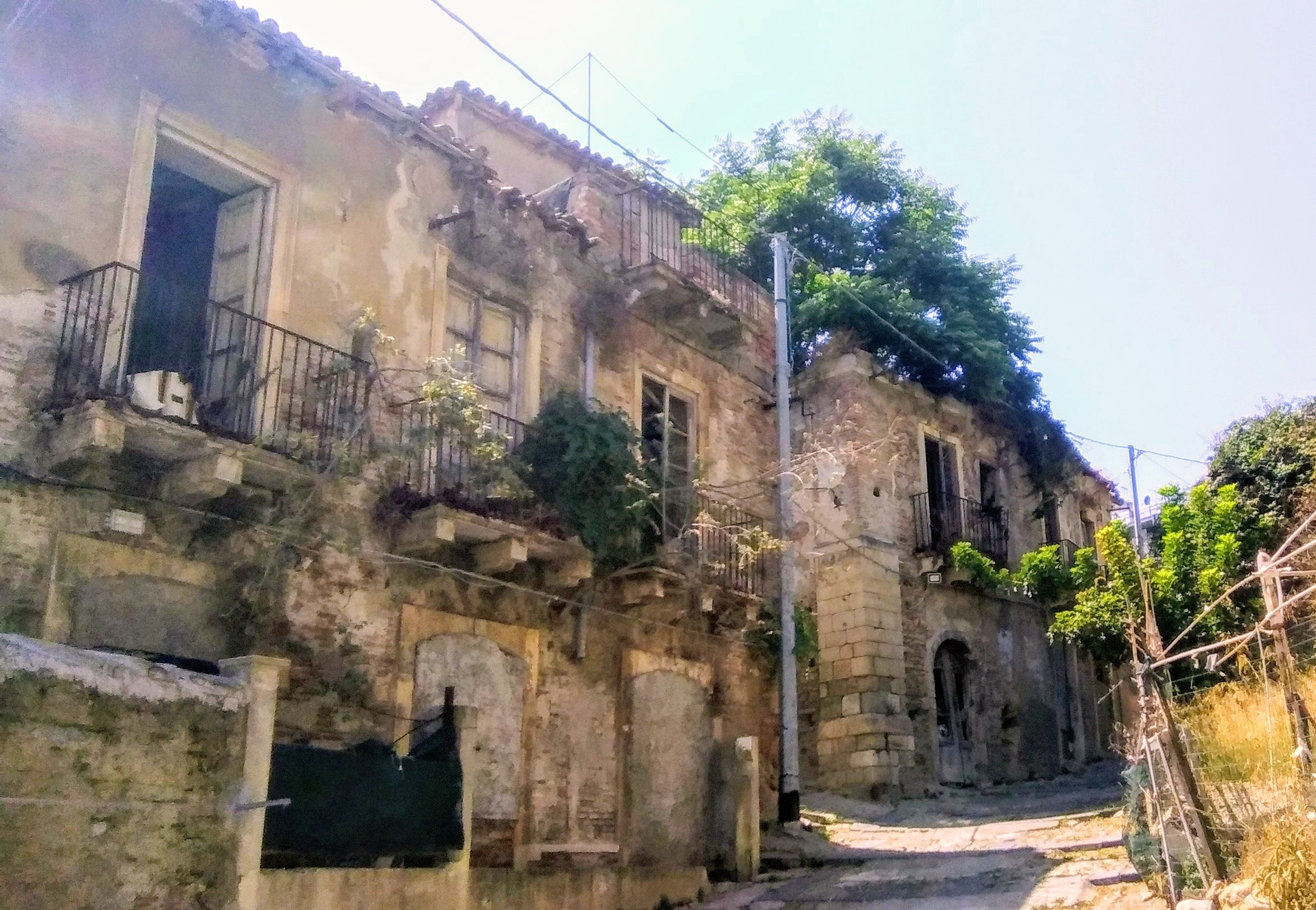
Section of extant 18th century houses in the old quarter of Tirone which withstood the earthquake

The new city of Messina was constructed on the rubble of the old city using the plan of a modern layout of a "city regularly cut up like a checker board" with buildings of uniform size and height as presented in 1911 by architect Luigi Borzì (1853–1919). This necessitated the demolition of buildings that were salvageable but did not conform to the new urban plan. These included the Palazzata, Baroque San Gregorio church situated above Via Monasteri and the 18th century Chiesa delle Anime del Purgatorio located in Via Cardines and Largo Purgatorio. The latter church was badly damaged but principally in the apsidal section and was reparable. It was demolished to extend Via Garibaldi in a southerly direction.

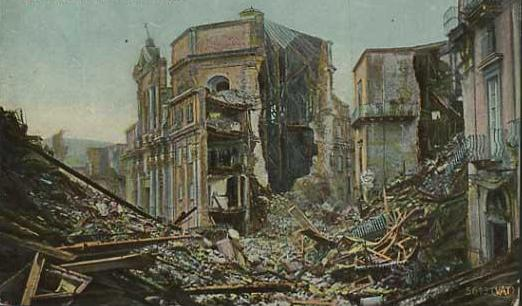
The badly damaged but salvageable Chiesa delle Anime del Purgatorio as viewed from Via Garibaldi. It was subsequently demolished to conform to the new street plan

=== Relocation ===
In the wake of the earthquake, many of the homeless residents of Messina and Calabria were relocated to various parts of Sicily and other regions of mainland Italy. In 1909, the SS Florida, carrying 850 emigrants from Naples, collided in a fog with RMS Republic. Three people aboard the Florida died in the collision. The passengers descended into panic and the captain had to shoot in the air to calm them down. The ship was eventually rescued and arrived in New York.

A 2025 study examined whether the earthquake prompted increased emigration to the United States, finding no evidence of a substantial increase in emigration following the earthquake.

=== Effects on society ===
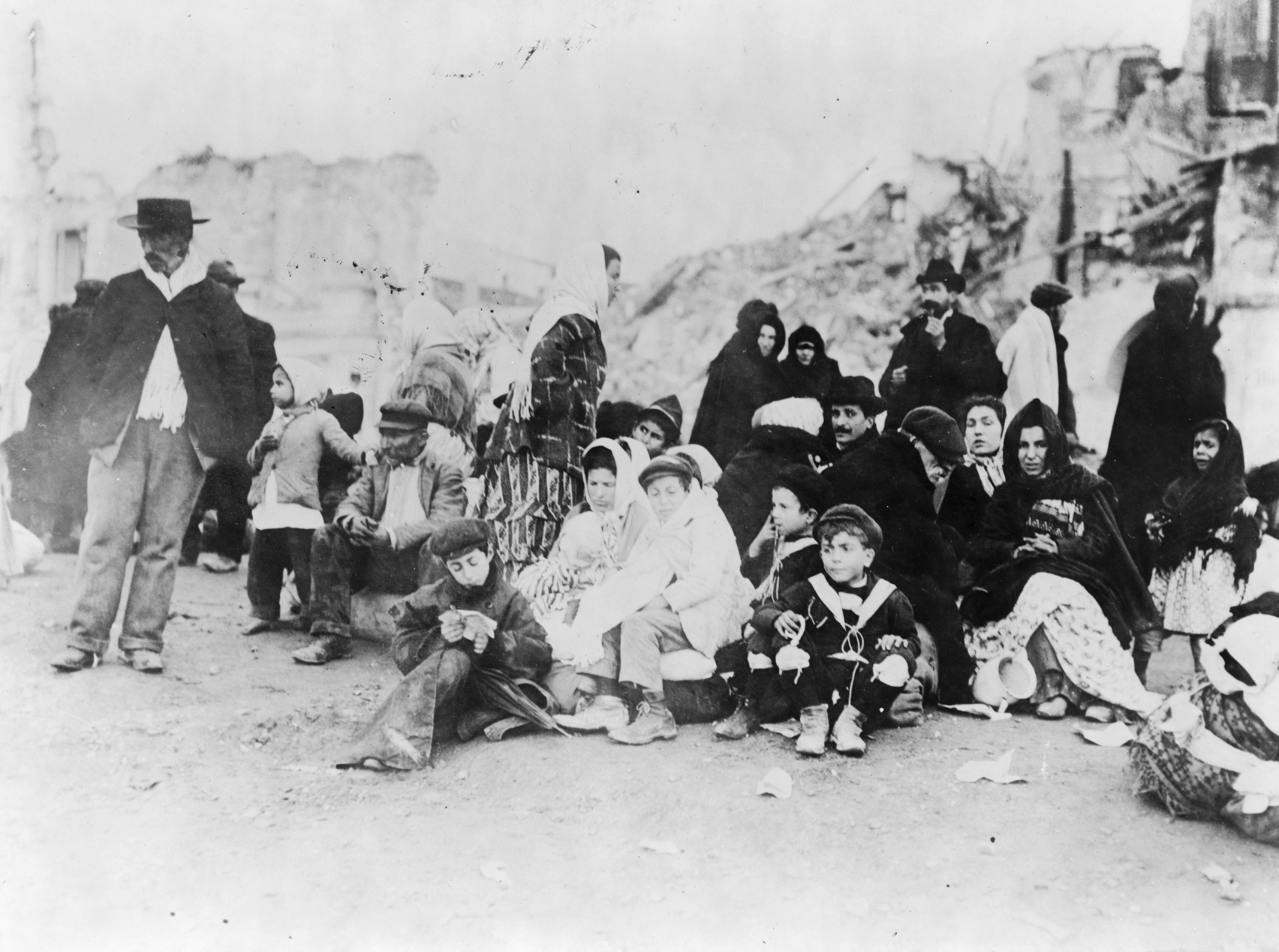
Survivors of the earthquake in Messina, c. 1909

The disaster affected the local economy and Messina faced a temporary depopulation after so many homeless survivors had sought refuge elsewhere, in particular Catania and Palermo where a large number found work as artisans. It has been estimated that only 19,000 remained with just 2000 in the old city center. However, there was soon a huge influx of migrants, mostly from nearby Sicilian and Calabrian localities who were needed as necessary labourers for the reconstruction. According to the 1911 census the population of Messina had increased to 127,000. Among these were many Messinesi who had returned to their native city. Men notably outnumbered the women which resulted in a decrease in marriages.

As late as 2021, families were still living in the wooden barracks in zones known as Baraccopoli which were erected in 1909 to provide temporary housing for the homeless survivors.

Because of its dearth of historical buildings due to the catastrophic 1908 earthquake, as well as the 1943 Allied bombardment during World War II, Messina has been called "the city without memory".

== Gallery ==
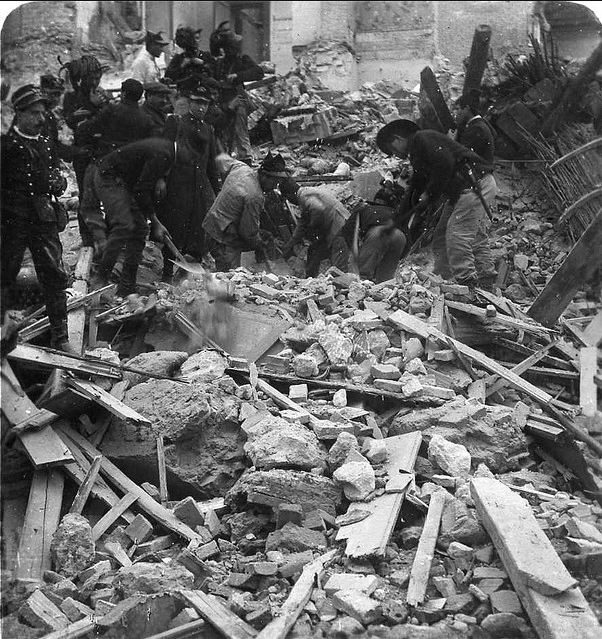
Bersaglieri digging in the ruins after the earthquake in Messina, December 1908

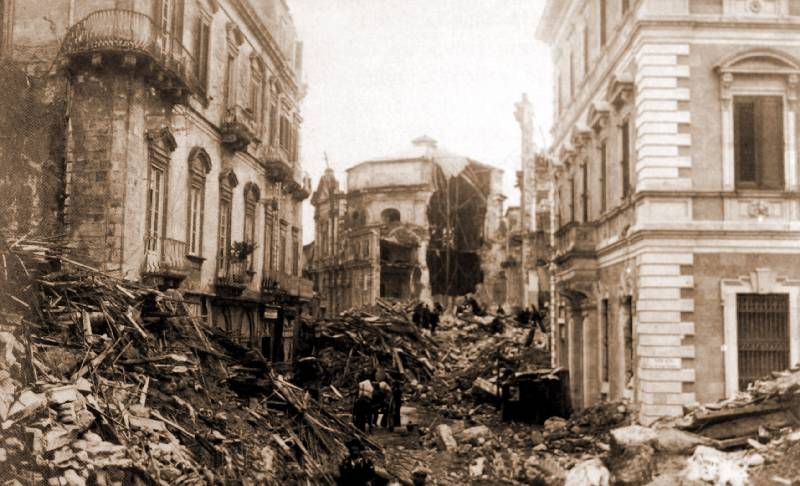
Via Garibaldi with the heavily damaged Chiesa delle Anime del Purgatorio in the background

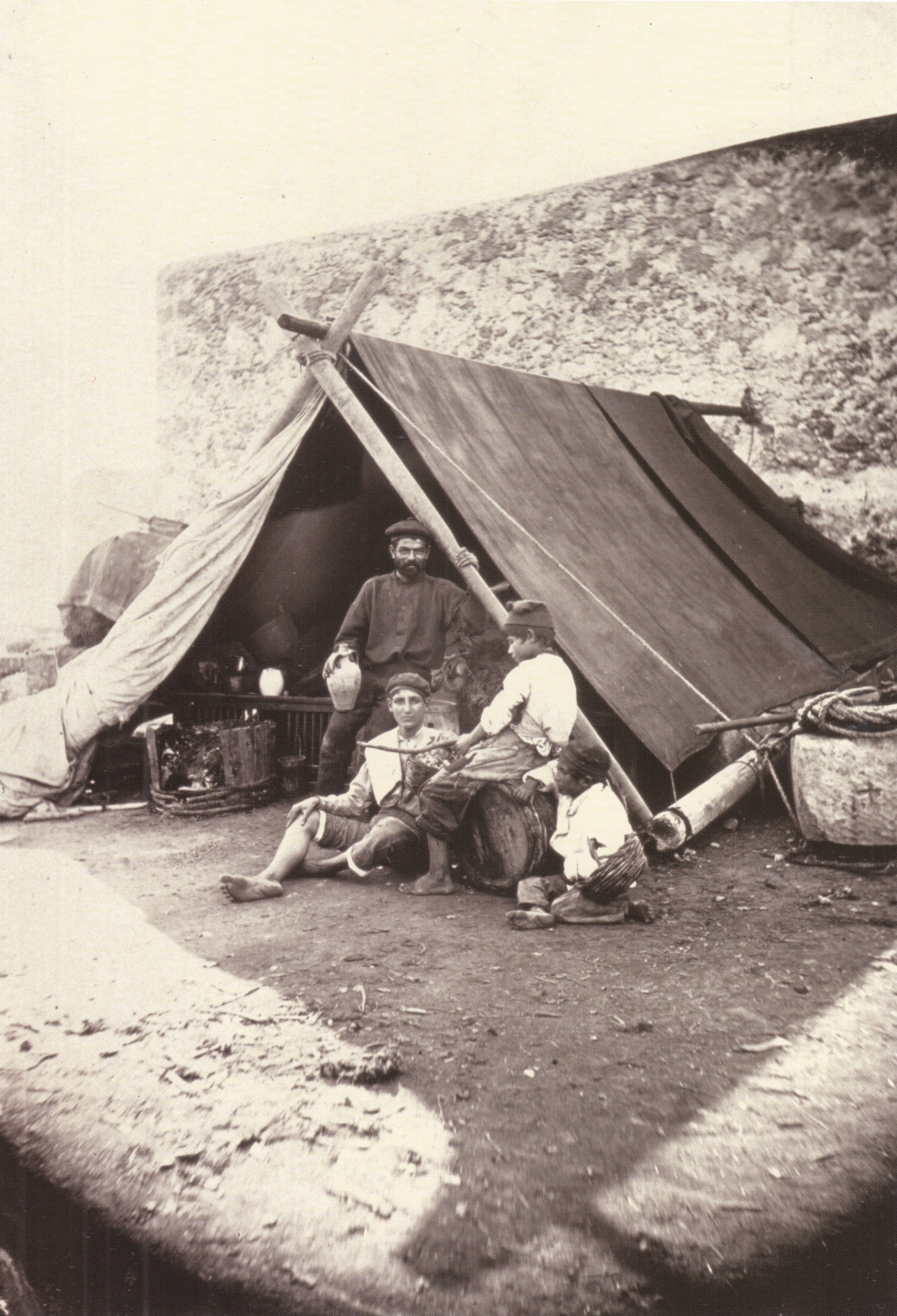
Homeless survivors of the earthquake of Messina, in 1908, under a tent

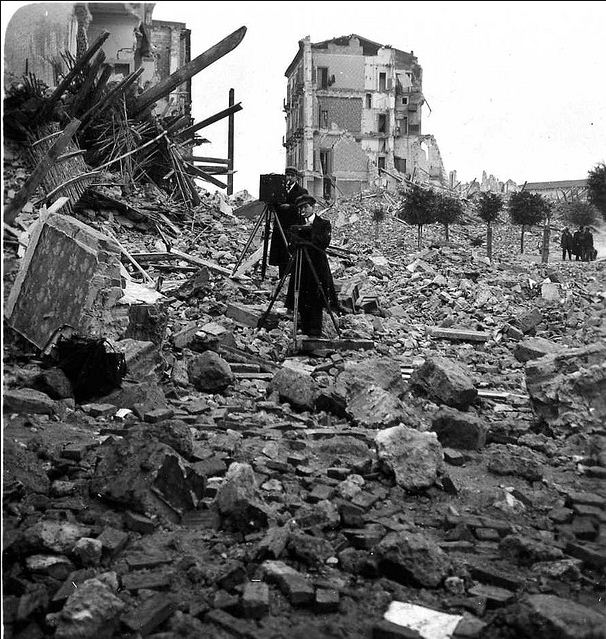
Two photo reporters among the ruins in Via Prima Settembre after the earthquake in Messina, December 1908

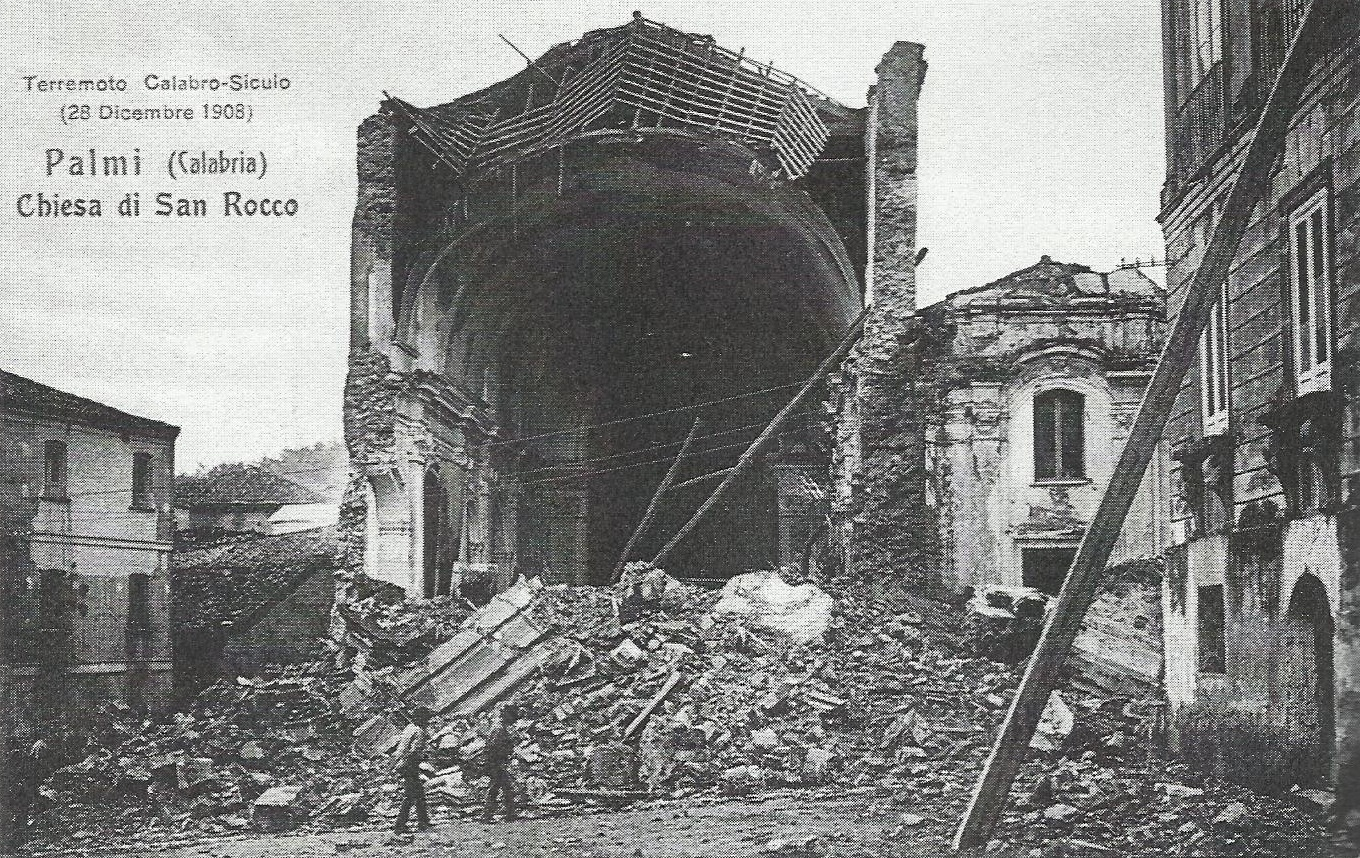
The destroyed church of San Rocco in Palmi, Calabria

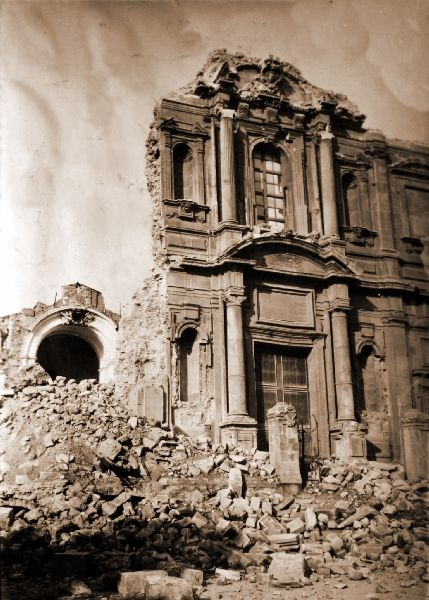
The ruins of St. John of Malta church. The Prefecture of Messina was constructed on its site

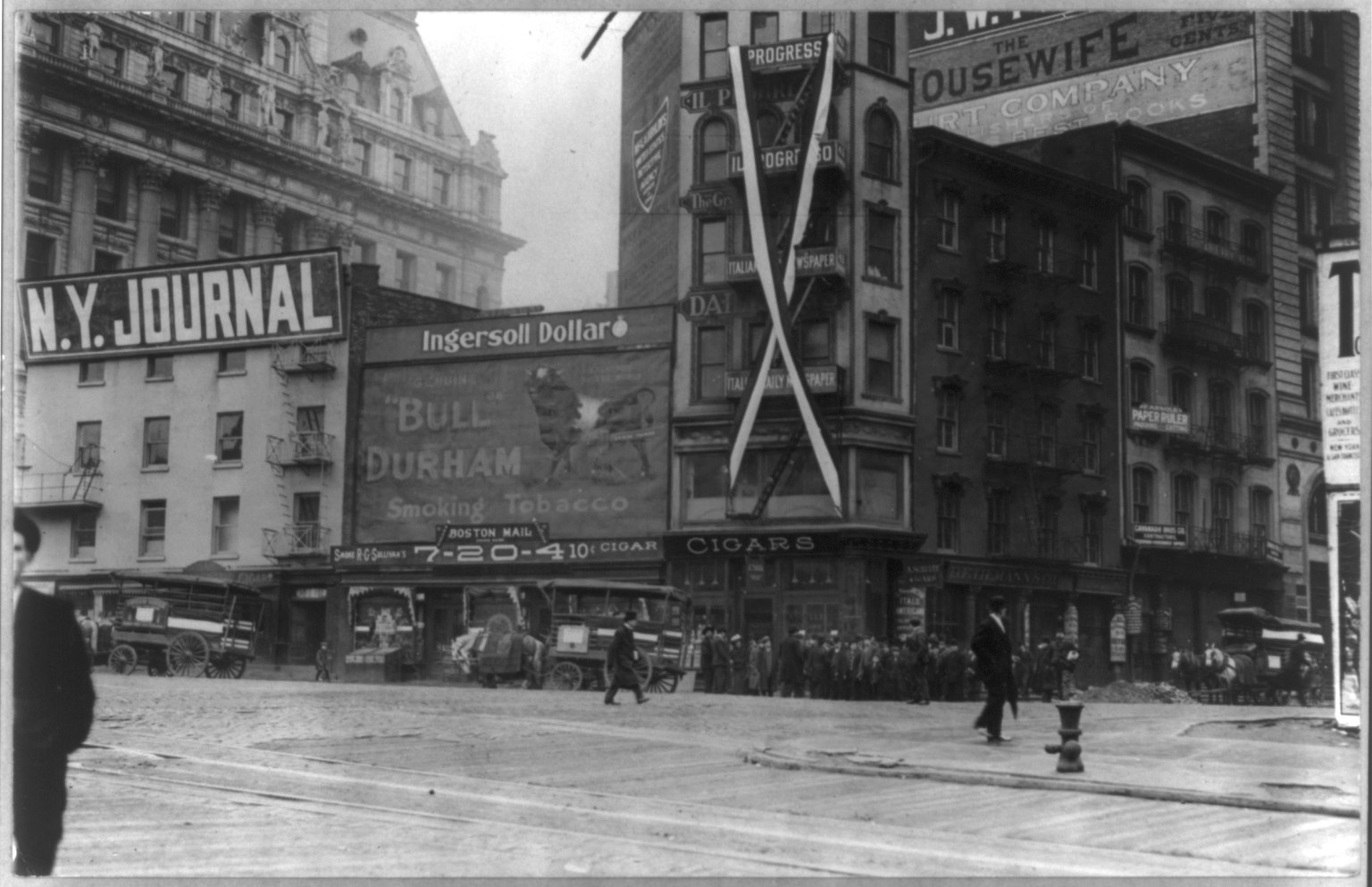
New York residents on Lower East Side line up to donate clothing

== See also ==
- List of earthquakes in 1908
- List of earthquakes in Italy
