= Roberto de' Nobili (1541–1559) =

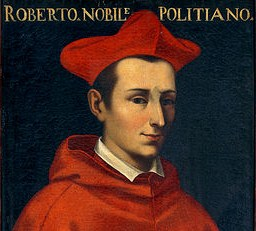
Roberto de' Nobili

Roberto de' Nobili (1541–1559) was a grand-nephew of Pope Julius III, who made him a cardinal of the Catholic Church at the age of twelve.

== Biography ==
Roberto de' Nobili was born in Montepulciano on 17 September 1541, the son of Vincenzo de' Nobili, count of Civitella, and Maddalena Barbolani, the niece of Pope Julius III, from the family of the counts of Montauto. His paternal ancestry was that of the De Nobili family of Montepulciano.

His family moved to Rome in 1550 when Pope Julius III was elected. As a boy he was tutored by Giulio Poggiano, Ottavio Pantagato, and Girolamo Ponzio, and by age ten was fluent in Latin and Ancient Greek. He also studied philosophy, literature, and the Scriptures.

Pope Julius III made him a cardinal deacon in the consistory of 22 December 1553, when he was twelve years old. He was assigned the deaconry of Santa Maria in Domnica on 6 February 1555. He participated in the papal conclave of April 1555 that elected Pope Marcellus II and the papal conclave of May 1555 that elected Pope Paul IV.

Pope Paul IV made him librarian of the Holy Roman Church. He considered resigning as a cardinal on several occasions, hoping to join the Society of Jesus (Jesuits) or the Order of Friars Minor Capuchin, but was dissuaded from doing so by his confessor, the Spanish Jesuit Juan de Polanco.

He died in Rome on 18 January 1559. He was buried in San Pietro in Montorio and his entrails were buried in San Bernardo alle Terme.
