= Gregorio Zappalà =

Italian sculptor

Gregorio Zappalà (13 December 1833 in Siracusa – 28 December 1908 in Messina) was an Italian sculptor.

Before he committed to becoming a craftsman in a bronze foundry, the profession of his father; the tried his hand as painter; then mosaicist, and finally engraver. For the next 16 years, he vacillated among professions, till by 1860, he focused on sculpture, after a brief study of design at the University of Messina.

In 1861, he was commissioned a bust of General Enrico Cialdini by the city of Messina; this gained him a three-year stipend to work in Rome. Among his main works: Eight sculptural groups (1870) at the Fountain of Neptune in Piazza Navona in Rome, won by contest. The original basin had been completed by Giacomo Della Porta in the 17th century. The central Neptune sculpture was created by Antonio della Bitta with the remaining figures by Zappala.

Zappala also completed a St Peter, one of the 12 statues at the basilica of San Paolo Fuori le Mura in Rome. He was awarded a medal and diploma in the first contest for the monument to King Vittorio Emanuele II. He completed monuments to Giuseppe La Farina and Francesco Miceli found in the camposanto of Messina, and the first of these at the Promotrice of Rome, won the silver medal of honor. He sculpted a copy of the Fountain of Neptune, (larger than life), to replace the prior work by Giovanni Angelo Montorsoli in Messina. He also sculpted Portrait of his dead wife, and many other busts and small monuments. Zappala was knighted in the Order of the Crown of Italy. He died during the 1908 Messina earthquake.
