= Fontana della Navicella, Rome =

Fountain in Rome

Fontana della Navicella
- Fountain
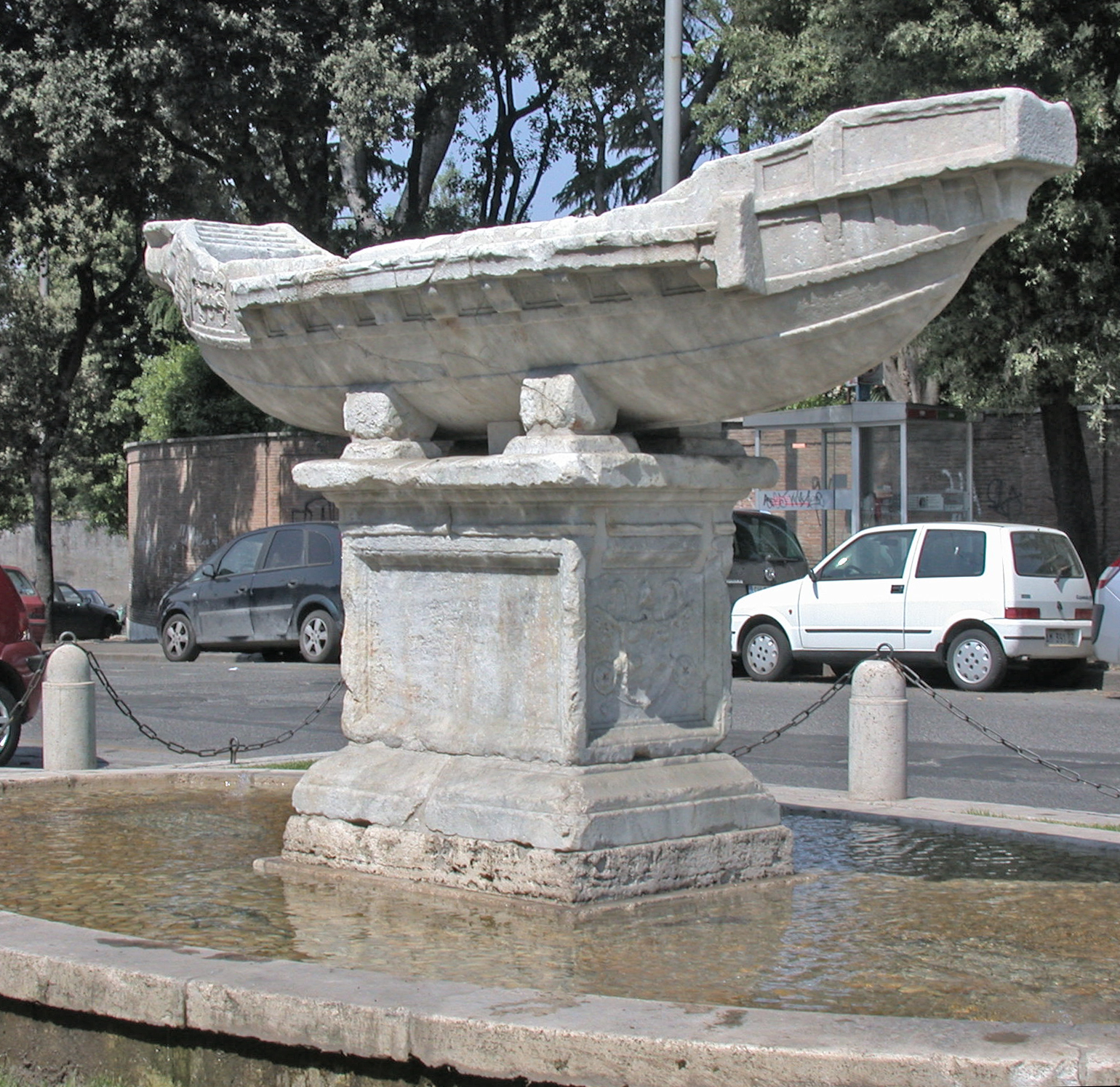
- La fontana della Navicella in front of Santa Maria in Domnica
- Design: Andrea Sansovino
- Location: Rome
- Interactive map of Fontana della Navicella
- Coordinates: 41°53′05″N 12°29′45″E

The Fontana della Navicella (Fountain of the Small Ship) is a fountain built around a marble and travertine replica of an Ancient Roman sculpture, depicting a decorated Roman Galley, and erected in front of the church of Santa Maria in Domnica of Rome, Italy. While the statue is a copy (1518–1519) made by Andrea Sansovino on commission from Pope Leo X based on fragments discovered near the church.

== History ==
The origins of the ship sculpture are vague. The prow of the galley is decorated with a boar's head. Some attribute the sculpture as having been part of a chapel dedicated to the cult of the goddess Isis, protector of mariners, used by sailors housed near here during the Ancient Roman empire. Others claim it was an ex voto from the Castra Peregrina, housed near here and consisting of soldiers from regions from provinces distal to Rome, many of whom traveled here by ship.

For years it formed part of the entrance to the church, but in 1931 it was formulated as part of a fountain in front of the church. It suffers frequent vandalism.

== See also ==
- List of fountains in Rome

| Preceded by Nasone | Landmarks of Rome; Fontana della Navicella, Rome | Succeeded by Fountain of Neptune, Rome |
