= Santa Maria in Domnica =

Basilica di Santa Maria in Domnica
- Basilica Minore di Santa Maria in Domnica alla Navicella (in Italian)
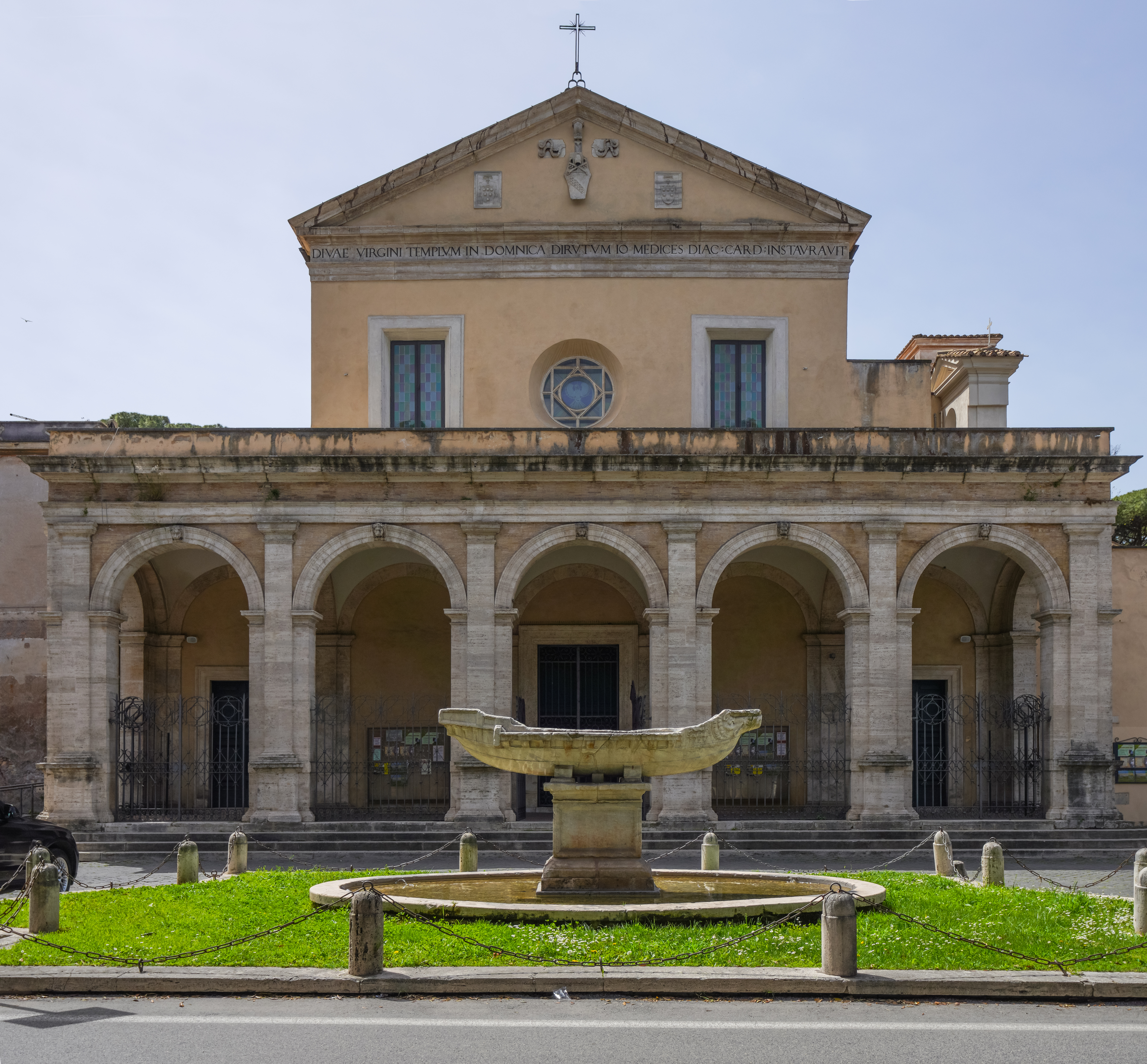
- Façade of Santa Maria in Domnica
- Click on the map for a fullscreen view
- 41°53′4.8″N 12°29′44.1″E
- Location: Via della Navicella 10, Rome
- Country: Italy
- Denomination: Roman Catholic
- Tradition: Roman Rite
- Religious institute: Priestly Fraternity of the Missionaries of St. Charles Borromeo
- Website: Official Website

History
- Status: Minor basilica, titular church, parish church
- Dedication: Mary, mother of Jesus

Architecture
- Architectural type: Church
- Style: Early Christian, Renaissance, Baroque
- Groundbreaking: 5th century AD

The Minor Basilica of St. Mary in Domnica alla Navicella (Basilica Minore di Santa Maria in Domnica alla Navicella), or simply Santa Maria in Domnica or Santa Maria alla Navicella, is a Roman Catholic basilica in Rome, Italy, dedicated to the Blessed Virgin Mary and active in local charity according to its long tradition. It is one of the best examples of the Carolingian Renaissance in Rome. It has been the titular church of Cardinal Marcello Semeraro since 28 November 2020.

== Name ==
The appellation "in Domnica" has been differently explained. One interpretation is that it derives from "dominicum" ("of the Lord"), and by extension "church". A second interpretation is that the name derives from the Latin phrase in dominica (praedia) ("on Imperial property"). One other possible explanation is that it is almost the only one of the lesser churches in Rome that serves as a station church on a Sunday, namely the second Sunday of Lent (dominica means "Sunday" in Latin; the other such church is San Pancrazio which serves as station for Low Sunday), so given the huge number of churches dedicated to the Blessed Virgin this might have been chosen as identifier.

Another interpretation is that it refers to the name of Cyriaca, a Christian woman who resided nearby and whose name denotes "belonging to the Lord": "Dominica" in Latin. According to this tradition, Cyriaca was a wealthy widow, whose home was used as a meeting-place for some of the first Christians of Rome. Saint Lawrence used to distribute alms here. After his death, Cyriaca arranged the burial in her family catacomb cemetery, where the basilica San Lorenzo fuori le Mura now stands.

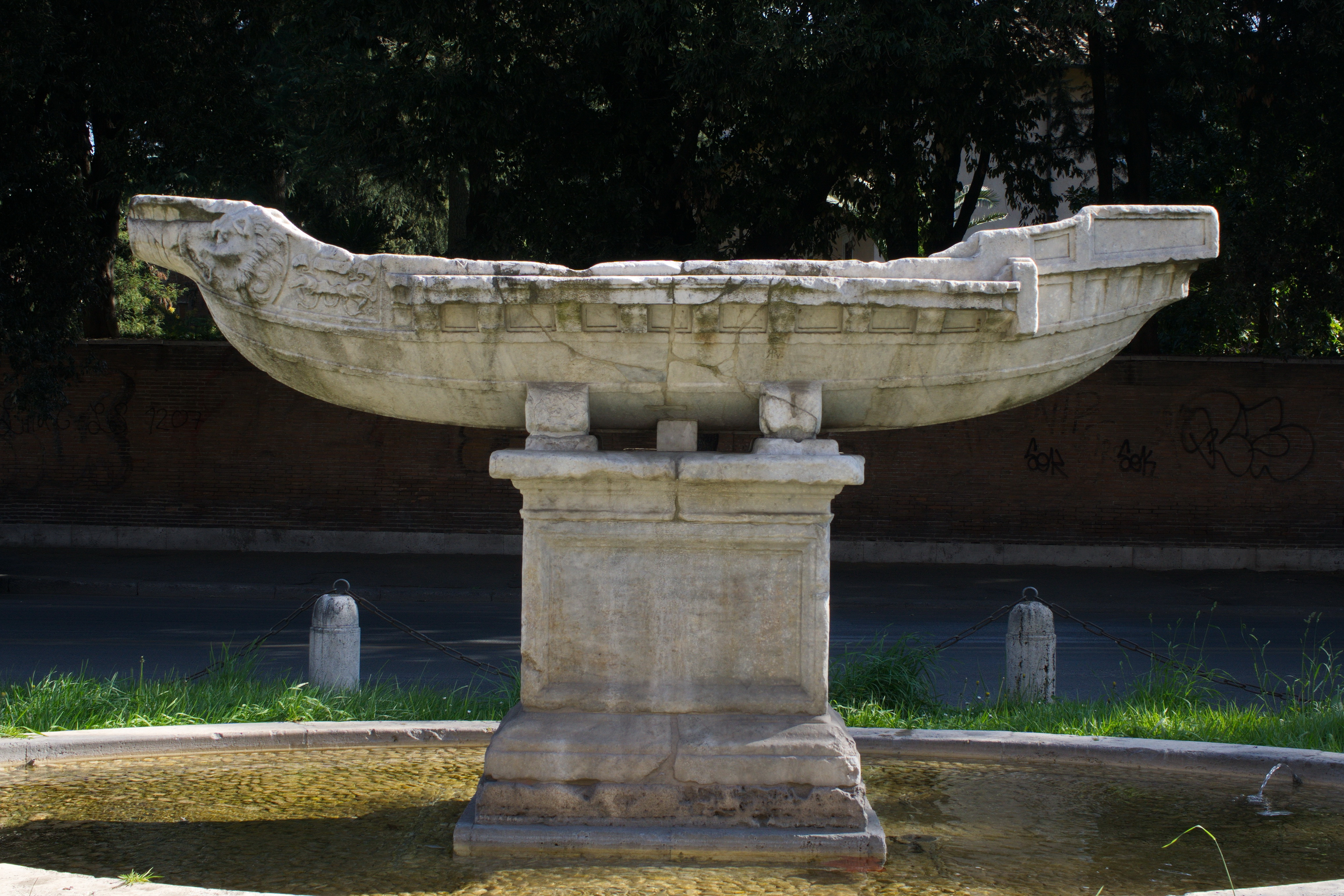
Fontana della Navicella

The appellation "alla Navicella" denotes "near the little ship", and refers to the sculpture of a Roman ship that has been in this location since ancient times, possibly as a votive offering at an ancient temple. Pope Leo X turned it into a fountain (Fontana della Navicella) in front of the church.

== History ==
The basilica was built in ancient times, close to the barracks of the Fifth Cohort of the Roman Vigiles on the Caelian Hill. It is mentioned in the records of a synod of Pope Symmachus in AD 499. In 678, it was one of seven churches assigned to deacons by Pope Agatho. The basilica was rebuilt from 818 to 822 by Pope Paschal I, and included mosaic decoration. Pope Paschal I is credited with Rome's early 9th century age of renovation and artistic splendor.

Benedict, legate to the Latin Empire (1205–1207), began his career as a cardinal in Santa Maria in 1200–1201. A small Olivetan monastery was established here in 1340.

The Medici family extensively modified the interior in the 16th century, because some of them were the cardinal holders of the archdeaconate through much of that century. Giovanni di Lorenzo de' Medici (1488), was followed by his first cousin, Giulio di Giuliano de 'Medici, (1513). Giovanni di Cosimo I de' Medici became cardinal-deacon at the age of 17 in 1560, but died of malaria in 1562. He was followed by his brother Ferdinando I de' Medici, who later became Grand Duke of Tuscany.

== Description ==
=== Exterior ===
In 1488, Lorenzo de' Medici prevailed on his relative Pope Innocent VIII to name his son, Giovanni Cardinal-deacon of Santa Maria in Domnica when he was age 13, although he was not allowed to wear the insignia until three years later. In 1513, shortly before he became Pope Leo X, Cardinal de' Medici, in conjunction with Andrea Sansovino, added the facade portico with Tuscan columns and the fountain.

The facade of the basilica, attributed to Sansovino, is in the Renaissance style, and has a porch with five arches separated by travertine pilasters, with two square and one round window. The tympanum has the coat of arms of Pope Innocent VIII in the center, and that of cardinals Giovanni and Ferdinando de' Medici on the sides. The inconspicuous bell tower houses a bell from 1288.

=== Interior ===
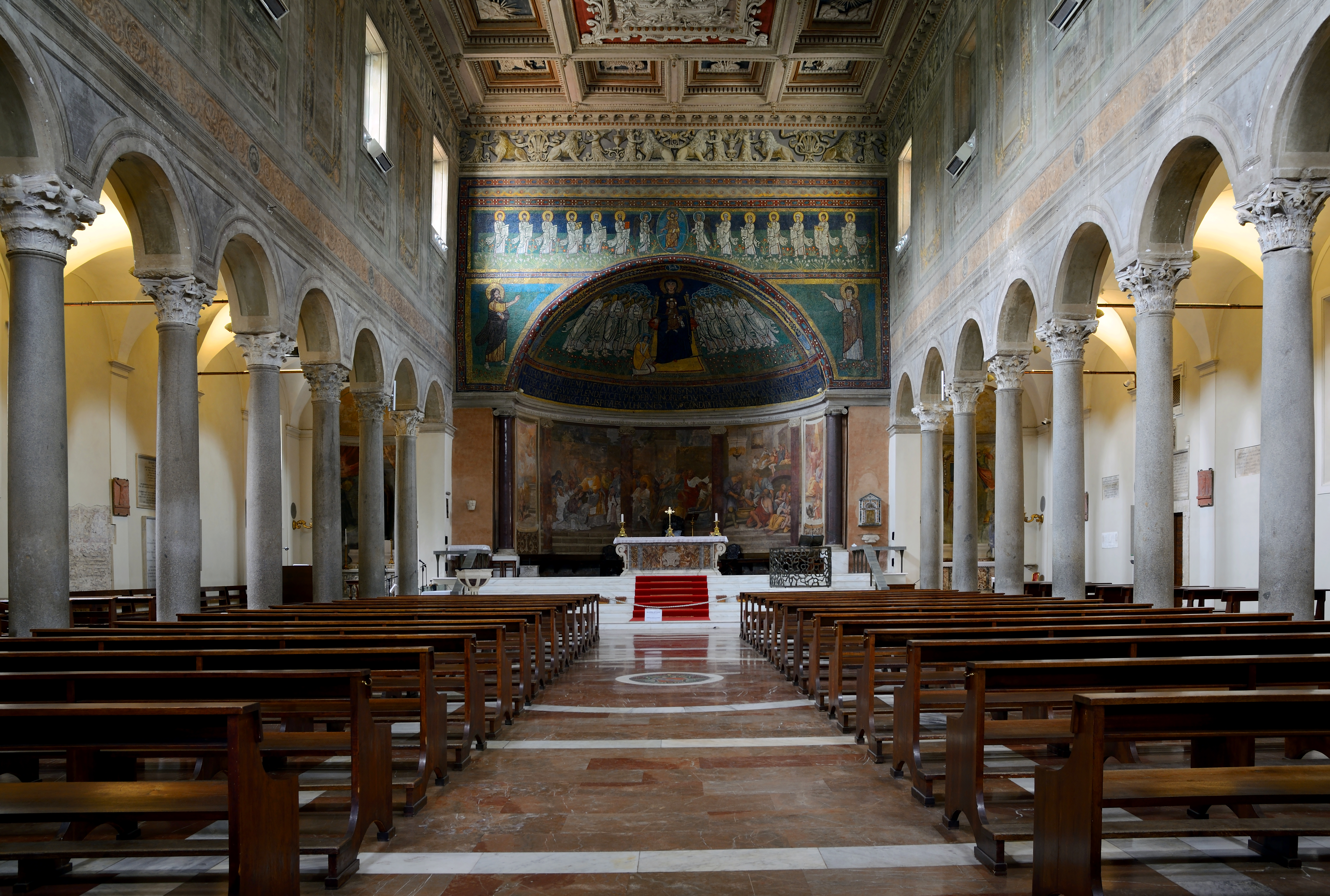
View of the nave towards apse

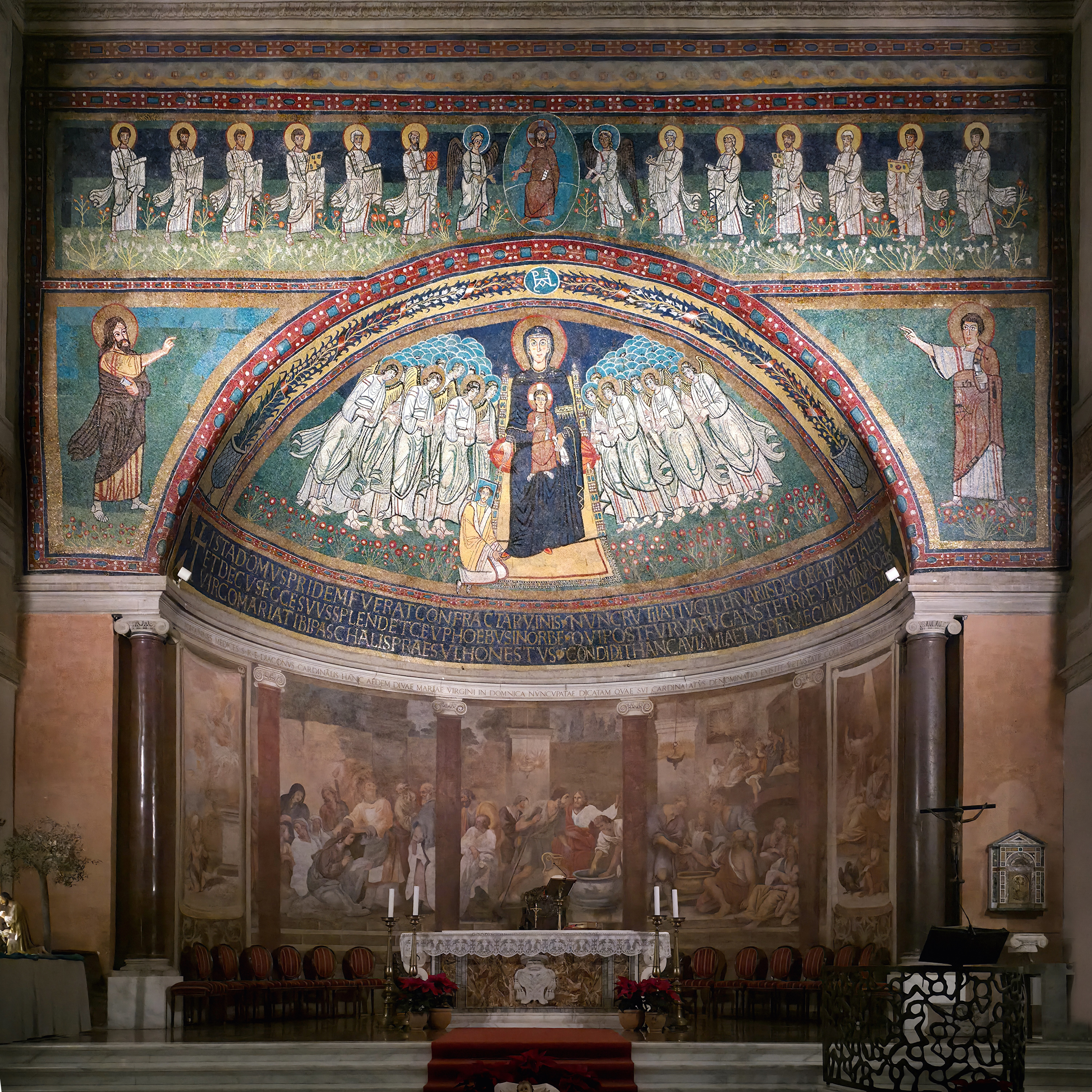
Apse mosaic (9th century) commissioned by Pope Paschal I

The interior of the basilica retains its 9th century plan, and consists of a nave and two lateral aisles of equal length and separated by 18 granite columns which were spolia from an ancient temple and crowned with Corinthian capitals. The wall above the windows was frescoed by Perin del Vaga, based on designs of Giulio Romano.

The nave has frescos by Lazzaro Baldi. The coffered ceiling, donated by Ferdinando I de' Medici, has the Medici coat of arms in the center, with symbolic representations of Noah's Ark and Solomon's Temple.

The triumphal arch at the apse is flanked by two porphyry columns. The mosaics of the apse from the 9th century, were commissioned by Pope Paschal I and depict Christ with two angels, and the twelve Apostles, with Moses and Elijah shown underneath. In the semi-dome, Pope Paschal (with a square halo) sitting at the foot of the Blessed Virgin Mary, vested as a Byzantine noblewoman, seated on a throne with the Christ Child, and surrounded by a multitude of angels.

== List of Cardinal Deacons ==
- Friedrich von Lothringen OSB (1049–1057)
- Hildebrand von Soana OSB (1059–1073)
- Giovanni di Subiaco OSB (1088–1123)
- Crescenzio (1112–1120)
- Stefano (1120–1122)
- Angelo (1122–1130)
- Gerardo (1134–1145)
- Simeone Borelli OSB (1158–1159 oder 1169)
- Benedetto (1200–1201)
- Roger (1202–1206)
- Tommaso Orsini dei Conti di Manupello (1383–1390)
- Pietro Morosini (1408–1424)
- vacant (1424–1473)
- Pedro González de Mendoza (1473–1478)
- Ferry de Clugny (1482–1483)
- Giambattista Orsini (1483–1484)
- Giovanni de’ Medici (1492–1513)
- Giulio de’ Medici (1513–1517)
- Innocenzo Cibo (1517–1550)
- Niccolò Gaddi (1550)
- Andrea Cornaro (1550–1551)
- vacant (1551–1555)
- Roberto de’ Nobili (1555–1559)
- Alfonso Carafa (1559–1560)
- Giovanni de’ Medici (1560–1562)
- Ferdinando I de' Medici (1565–1585)
- Charles de Lorraine de Vaudémont (1585–1587)
- Federico Borromeo (1588–1589)
- Francesco Maria del Monte (1589–1591)
- Flaminio Piatti (1591–1592)
- vacant (1592–1596)
- Andrea Baroni Peretti Montalto (1596–1600)
- vacant (1600–1610)
- Ferdinando Gonzaga (1610–1612)
- vacant (1612–1616)
- Carlo di Ferdinando de’ Medici (1616–1623)
- vacant (1623–1627)
- Alessandro Cesarini (1627–1632)
- vacant (1632–1644)
- Camillo Francesco Maria Pamphili (1644–1647)
- Lorenzo Raggi (1647–1652)
- Carlo Pio di Savoia (1654–1664)
- vacant (1664–1668)
- Sigismondo Chigi (1668–1670)
- Camillo Massimo (1671–1673)
- Pietro Basadonna (1674–1684)
- Francesco Maria de' Medici (1687–1709)
- Curzio Origo (1712–1716)
- vacant (1716–1725)
- Niccolò Paolo Andrea Coscia; Cardinal Priest pro hac vice (1725–1755)
- Vacant (1755–1803)
- Giovanni Castiglione (1803–1815)
- vacant (1815–1823)
- Tommaso Riario Sforza (1823–1834)
- Francesco Saverio Massimo (1842–1848)
- Roberto Giovanni F. Roberti (1850–1863)
- Domenico Consolini (1866–1884)
- Agostino Bausa OP (1887–1889)
- vacant (1889–1901)
- Luigi Tripepi (1901–1906)
- vacant (1906–1911)
- Basilio Pompili (1911–1914)
- Scipione Tecchi (1914–1915)
- Niccolò Marini (1916–1923)
- vacant (1923–1935)
- Camillo Caccia Dominioni (1935–1946)
- vacant (1946–1953)
- Alfredo Ottaviani (1953–1967); Cardinal Priest pro hac vice (1967–1979)
- vacant (1979–1983)
- Henri de Lubac SJ (1983–1991)
- Luigi Poggi (1994–2004)
- William Joseph Levada (2006–2016); Cardinal Priest pro hac vice (2016–2019)
- Marcello Semeraro (since 2020)

== Bibliography ==
- Armellini, Mariano, (1891). "S. Maria in Domnica" in Le chiese di Roma dal secolo IV al XIX, online version by Bill Thayer, Chicago, IL. Re-accessed 4 Feb 2022.
- de Nie, Giselle; Morrison, Karl Frederick; Mostert, Marco (2005). Seeing the Invisible in Late Antiquity and the Early Middle Ages: Papers from "Verbal and Pictorial Imaging: Representing and Accessing Experience of the Invisible, 400–1000": (Utrecht, 11–13 December 2003). Turnhout: Brepols.
  - Thunø, Erik (2005). "Materializing the Invisible in Early Medieval Art: The Mosaic of Santa Maria in Domnica in Rome", in Seeing the Invisible ..., pp. 265–89.
- Englen, Alia (2003). Caelius I: Santa Maria in Domnica, San Tommaso in Formis e il Clivus Scauri. Roma: Bretschneider.
- Goodson, Caroline (2010). The Rome of Pope Paschal I: Papal Power, Urban Renovation, Church Rebuilding and Relic Translation, 817–824. Cambridge: Cambridge University Press.
- Krautheimer, Richard, (1937). Corpus basilicarum Christianarum Romae. The early Christian basilicas of Rome (IV-IX cent.) Città del Vaticano, Pontificio istituto di archeologia cristiana, pp. 309 ff.
- Lansford, Tyler (2011). The Latin Inscriptions of Rome: A Walking Guide. Baltimore: Johns Hopkins University Press.
- Macadam, Alta (1994). Blue Guide Rome. London: A & C Black. ISBN 07136-3939-3.
- Matthiae, Guglielmo (1965). "S. Maria in Domnica". Chiese di Roma illustrate, Roma: Marietti, p. 56.
- Sundell, Michael G. (2007). Mosaics in the Eternal City. Tempe, AZ: Arizona Center for Medieval and Renaissance Studies, pp. 43 ff.
- Thayer, Bill, "S. Maria in Domnica", Gazetteer. Re-accessed 4 Feb 2022.

| Preceded by Santa Maria in Cosmedin | Landmarks of Rome; Santa Maria in Domnica | Succeeded by Santa Maria in Ara Coeli |
