= Cyriaca =

3rd-century Roman martyr and saint

Saint Cyriaca

Martyr
- Born: Rome, Roman Empire
- Died: 249
- Venerated in: Roman Catholic Church, Eastern Orthodox Church
- Canonized: Pre-congregation
- Major shrine: Santa Maria in Domnica, Rome, Italy
- Feast: 21 August

Cyriaca, also known as Dominica, was a Roman widow, and patroness to St. Lawrence, and eventually suffered martyrdom.

== Life ==
Cyriaca was a wealthy Roman widow who sheltered persecuted Christians. St. Lawrence used her home in Rome to give food to the poor. After his death, she brought his remains to a catacomb that had been dug into a hill on land she owned. This is now the site of San Lorenzo fuori le mura.

Cyriaca suffered martyrdom, by being scourged to death for her faith.

St. Cyriaca is commemorated on August 21.
