= List of earthquakes in 1908 =

Earthquakes in 1908
Approximate epicenters of the earthquakes in 1908
- 4.0–5.9 magnitude
- 6.0–6.9 magnitude
- 7.0–7.9 magnitude
- 8.0+ magnitude
- Strongest magnitude: Mexico, Guerrero, (Magnitude 7.7) 26 March
- Deadliest: Kingdom of Italy Sicily, (Magnitude 7.0) 28 December, 120,000 deaths
- Total fatalities: 120,000

Number by magnitude
- 9.0+: 0
- 8.0–8.9: 0
- 7.0–7.9: 10
- 6.0–6.9: 18
- 5.0–5.9: 0

This is a list of earthquakes in 1908. Only magnitude 6.0 or greater earthquakes appear on the list. Lower magnitude events are included if they have caused death, injury or damage. Events which occurred in remote areas will be excluded from the list as they wouldn't have generated significant media interest. All dates are listed according to UTC time. One of the early 20th century's worst earthquakes happened this year in Italy. A magnitude 8.2 earthquake was said to have occurred off the Peruvian coast on 12 December. This earthquake has been proven to be of false origin since seismological data does not support its existence.

== Overall ==
=== By death toll ===
Rank	Death toll	Magnitude	Location	MMI	Depth (km)	Date
1	120,000	7.0	Kingdom of Italy, Sicily	XI (Extreme)	15.0	28 December

- Note: At least 10 casualties

=== By magnitude ===
Rank	Magnitude	Death toll	Location	MMI	Depth (km)	Date
1	7.7	0	Mexico, Guerrero	( )	80.0	26 March
2	7.5	0	Dutch East Indies, off west coast of Sumatra	( )	130.0	6 February
3	7.2	0	Scotia Sea	( )	0.0	17 August
4	7.1	0	Japan, off east coast of Honshu	( )	35.0	15 January
= 5	7.0	0	Mexico, off the coast of Guerrero	( )	0.0	27 March
= 5	7.0	0	Southwest Indian Ridge	( )	0.0	22 April
= 6	7.0	0	United States, Gulf of Alaska	( )	0.0	15 May
= 6	7.0	0	Afghanistan, Badakhshan Province	( )	220.0	24 October
= 6	7.0	0	British Burma, Kachin State	( )	15.0	12 December
= 6	7.0	120,000	Italy, Sicily	XI (Extreme)	15.0	28 December

- Note: At least 7.0 magnitude

== Notable events ==
=== January ===
January
- Strongest magnitude: 7.1 M_{w} Japan
- Total fatalities: 0

Number by magnitude
- 8.0–8.9: 0
- 7.0–7.9: 1
- 6.0–6.9: 1

Date	Country and location	M_{w}	Depth (km)	MMI	Notes	Casualties	
Date	Country and location	M_{w}	Depth (km)	MMI	Notes	Dead	Injured
11	Taiwan, Taitung County	6.8	5.0				
15	Japan, off the east coast of Honshu	7.1	35.0				

=== February ===
February
- Strongest magnitude: 7.5 M_{w} Dutch East Indies
- Total fatalities: 0

Number by magnitude
- 8.0–8.9: 0
- 7.0–7.9: 1
- 6.0–6.9: 2

Date	Country and location	M_{w}	Depth (km)	MMI	Notes	Casualties	
Date	Country and location	M_{w}	Depth (km)	MMI	Notes	Dead	Injured
6	Dutch East Indies, off the west coast of Sumatra	7.5	130.0				
9	China, western Sichuan	6.7	15.0				
14	United States, southern Alaska	6.0	0.0		Depth unknown.		

=== March ===
March
- Strongest magnitude: 7.7 M_{w} Mexico
- Total fatalities: 0

Number by magnitude
- 8.0–8.9: 0
- 7.0–7.9: 2
- 6.0–6.9: 3

Date	Country and location	M_{w}	Depth (km)	MMI	Notes	Casualties	
Date	Country and location	M_{w}	Depth (km)	MMI	Notes	Dead	Injured
5	Philippines, Mindanao	6.9	0.0		Depth unknown.		
12	Afghanistan, Badakhshan Province	6.5	200.0				
23	Dutch East Indies, Timor Sea	6.6	0.0		Some damage was caused on Timor. Depth unknown.		
26	Mexico, Guerrero	7.7	80.0		Some damage was caused.		
27	Mexico, off the coast of Guerrero	7.0	0.0		Depth unknown.		

=== April ===
April
- Strongest magnitude: 7.0 M_{w} Southwest Indian Ridge
- Total fatalities: 0

Number by magnitude
- 8.0–8.9: 0
- 7.0–7.9: 1
- 6.0–6.9: 2

Date	Country and location	M_{w}	Depth (km)	MMI	Notes	Casualties	
Date	Country and location	M_{w}	Depth (km)	MMI	Notes	Dead	Injured
16	Afghanistan, Badakhshan Province	6.6	220.0				
19	Russia, Sea of Japan	6.7	450.0				
22	Southwest Indian Ridge	7.0	0.0		Depth unknown.		

=== May ===
May
- Strongest magnitude: 7.0 M_{w} United States
- Total fatalities: 0

Number by magnitude
- 8.0–8.9: 0
- 7.0–7.9: 1
- 6.0–6.9: 3

Date	Country and location	M_{w}	Depth (km)	MMI	Notes	Casualties	
Date	Country and location	M_{w}	Depth (km)	MMI	Notes	Dead	Injured
3	Russia, Kuril Islands	6.5	35.0				
5	Dutch East Indies, Celebes Sea	6.9	0.0		Depth unknown.		
15	United States, Gulf of Alaska	7.0	0.0		Depth unknown.		
17	Greece, south of Crete	6.6	100.0				

=== August ===
August
- Strongest magnitude: 7.2 M_{w} Scotia Sea
- Total fatalities: 0

Number by magnitude
- 8.0–8.9: 0
- 7.0–7.9: 1
- 6.0–6.9: 1

Date	Country and location	M_{w}	Depth (km)	MMI	Notes	Casualties	
Date	Country and location	M_{w}	Depth (km)	MMI	Notes	Dead	Injured
17	Scotia Sea	7.2	0.0		Depth unknown.		
20	China, western Xizang Province	6.9	15.0				

=== September ===
September
- Strongest magnitude: 6.8 M_{w} United States
- Total fatalities: 0

Number by magnitude
- 8.0–8.9: 0
- 7.0–7.9: 0
- 6.0–6.9: 1

Date	Country and location	M_{w}	Depth (km)	MMI	Notes	Casualties	
Date	Country and location	M_{w}	Depth (km)	MMI	Notes	Dead	Injured
21	United States, south of Hawaii (island)	6.8	0.0		Depth unknown.		

=== October ===
October
- Strongest magnitude: 7.0 M_{w} Afghanistan
- Total fatalities: 0

Number by magnitude
- 8.0–8.9: 0
- 7.0–7.9: 1
- 6.0–6.9: 3

Date	Country and location	M_{w}	Depth (km)	MMI	Notes	Casualties	
Date	Country and location	M_{w}	Depth (km)	MMI	Notes	Dead	Injured
6	Romania, Buzau County	6.6	150.0				
13	Mexico, Guerrero	6.9	0.0		Depth unknown.		
23	Afghanistan, Badakhshan Province	6.9	220.0	rowspan="2"|These events can be considered a doublet earthquake.			
24	Afghanistan, Badakhshan Province	7.0	220.0				

=== November ===
November
- Strongest magnitude: 6.9 M_{w} 2 events
- Total fatalities: 0

Number by magnitude
- 8.0–8.9: 0
- 7.0–7.9: 0
- 6.0–6.9: 2

Date	Country and location	M_{w}	Depth (km)	MMI	Notes	Casualties	
Date	Country and location	M_{w}	Depth (km)	MMI	Notes	Dead	Injured
2	Dutch East Indies, southwest of the Mentawai Islands	6.9	0.0		Depth unknown.		
6	Russia, Kuril Islands	6.9	0.0		Depth unknown.		

=== December ===
December
- Strongest magnitude: 7.2 M_{w} British Burma
- Deadliest: 7.0 M_{w} Italy; 120,000 deaths
- Total fatalities: 120,000

Number by magnitude
- 8.0–8.9: 1
- 7.0–7.9: 2
- 6.0–6.9: 0

Date	Country and location	M_{w}	Depth (km)	MMI	Notes	Casualties	
Date	Country and location	M_{w}	Depth (km)	MMI	Notes	Dead	Injured
12	British Burma, Kachin State	7.2	15.0				
28	Italy, Sicily	7.0	15.0	XI	The 1908 Messina earthquake caused 82,000 deaths in total. The earthquake contributed to 80,000 of the total. A tsunami resulted in another 2,000 deaths. Damage costs were around $116 million (1908 rate).	82,000	
