= Fountain of Neptune, Rome =

Fountain in Rome, Italy

Fountain of Neptune
- Fountain
- {{{other_names}}}
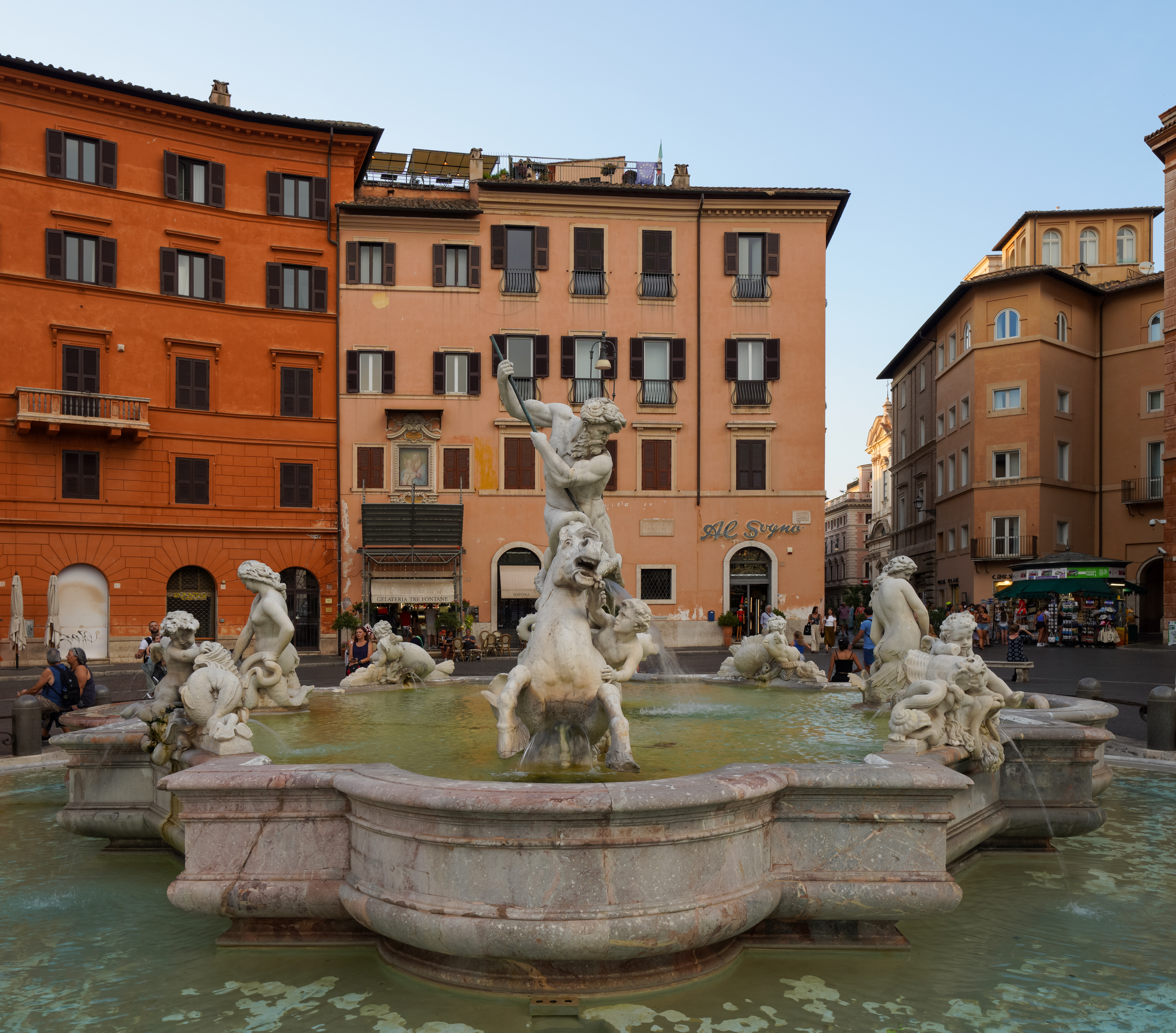
- Fountain of Neptune, Rome
- Design: Giacomo Della Porta
- Location: Piazza Navona, Rome, Italy
- Interactive map of Fountain of Neptune
- Coordinates: 41°53′59.35″N 12°28′22.95″E

The Fountain of Neptune (Italian: Fontana del Nettuno) is a fountain in Rome, Italy, located at the north end of the Piazza Navona.

== Name ==
It was once called "Fontana dei Calderari" because it was located close to a small alley with blacksmith's workshops, makers of pots and pans and of other metal based businesses, all of them generating heat.

== History ==
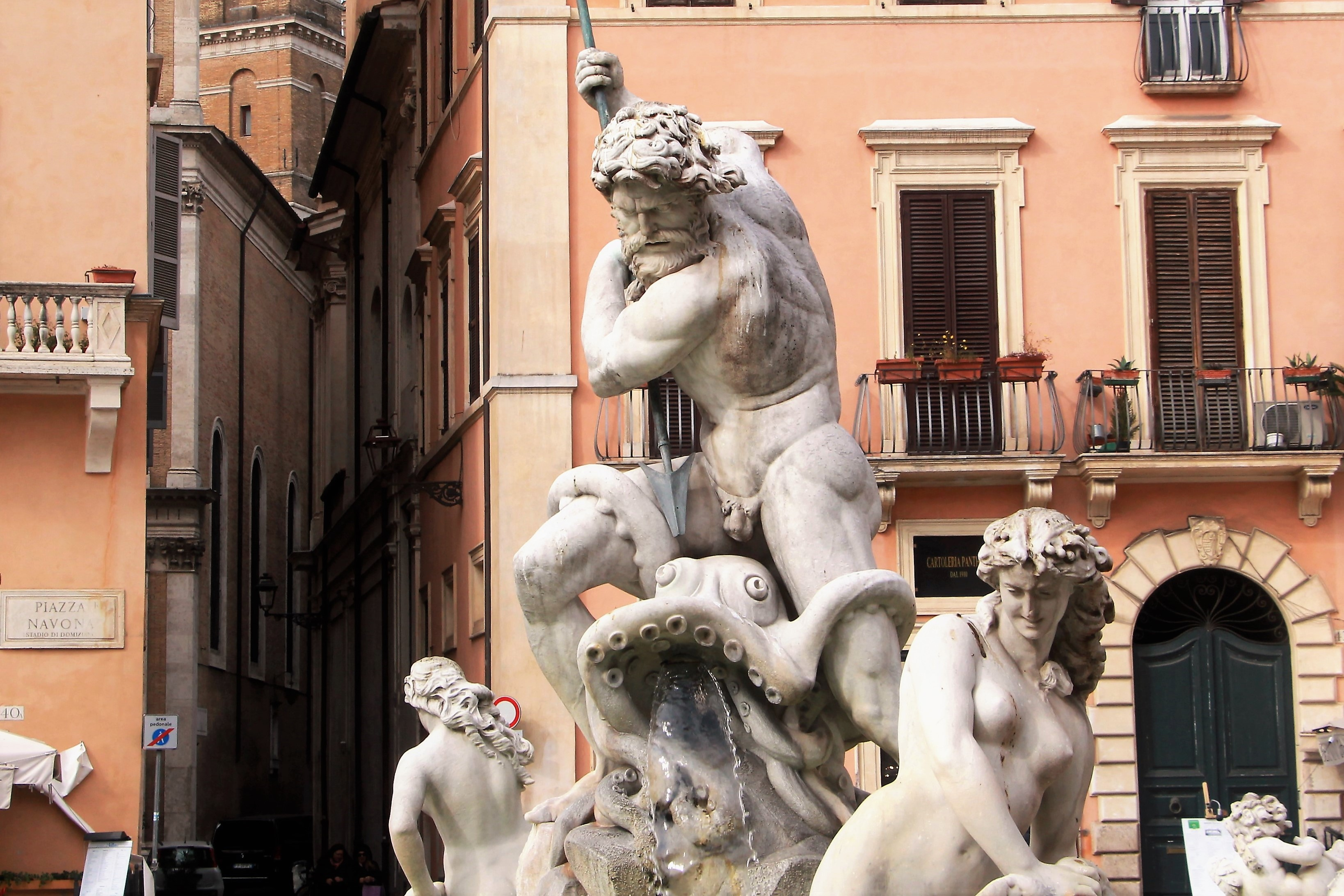
Fountain of Neptune, Piazza Navona (Rome)

The restoration of the Roman Aqua Virgo aqueduct in 1570 was immediately followed by the start of work on a continuation water supply pipe towards the district of the old Campo Marzio, which following the diminution of the city's size and importance was left as the most densely populated part of the city. Restoration of a piped water supply in turn permitted the construction of several public fountains. The basin of the Fontana del Nettuno, (without the sculptures), was designed in 1574 by Giacomo Della Porta, who was also responsible for the Moor Fountain at the other side of the square. It was sponsored by pope Gregory XIII. The lower part of the basin consists of white marble and the upper part of the local stone from Pietrasanta. For the next 300 years, the fountain survived without statues.

Nineteenth-century infrastructure developments reduced dependence on urban fountains for drinking and washing purposes but increased their visual and political importance, especially following the creation of the Italian state with Rome as its capital after 1870. The fountain as it exists today was finally completed in 1878 by Antonio della Bitta, who added the sculpture of Neptune fighting with an octopus, and Gregorio Zappalà, who created the other sculptures, based on the mythological theme of the "Nereids with Cupids and walruses". This statuary was added following a competition in 1873, in order to balance that of the Moor Fountain on the south side of the piazza and of the Fontana dei Quattro Fiumi (Fountain of the Four Rivers) at its centre.

Preceded by Fontana della Navicella, Rome	Landmarks of Rome; Fountain of Neptune, Rome	Succeeded by Fontana del Nettuno, Piazza del Popolo
