= Church of the Santissima Annunziata dei Catalani =

Church in Messina, Sicily, Italy

Coordinates: 38°11′28.5″N 15°33′22.5″E

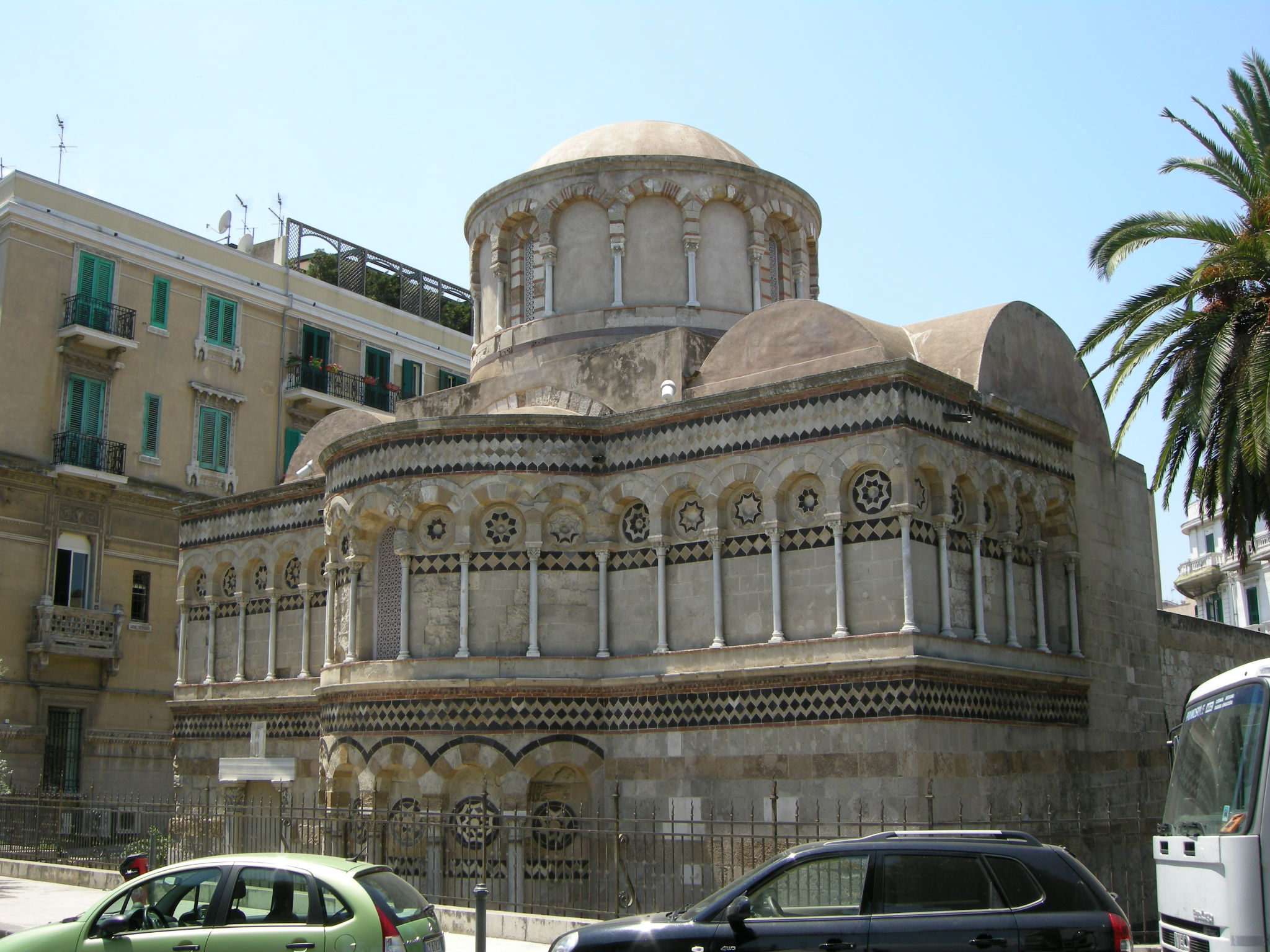
Church of the Santissima Annunziata dei Catalani

The Church of the Santissima Annunziata dei Catalani (Italian: Chiesa della Santissima Annunziata dei Catalani) is a church in Messina, Sicily, Italy. It is an example of Norman architecture in Sicily.

The church dates from the 12th century, when Sicily was under Norman rule. Built on top of the ruins of an older temple dedicated to Neptune, the church is an example of Sicilian Norman architecture with its mix of different cultural elements. The church displays influences from Arab and Byzantine architecture and also contains Roman elements. Particularly the apse is unusually well-preserved. Previously known as "Annunziata di Castellammare" on account of its proximity to an homonymous medieval fortress which guarded the inlet of the port and shipyard, its later established name derives from merchants from Catalonia who established a presence in Messina in the 16th century.

It is one of the few structures to have survived the catastrophic earthquake in 1908 which destroyed most of Messina. As a result of the earthquake the church is situated 3 metres below the reconstructed street level.

== Gallery ==
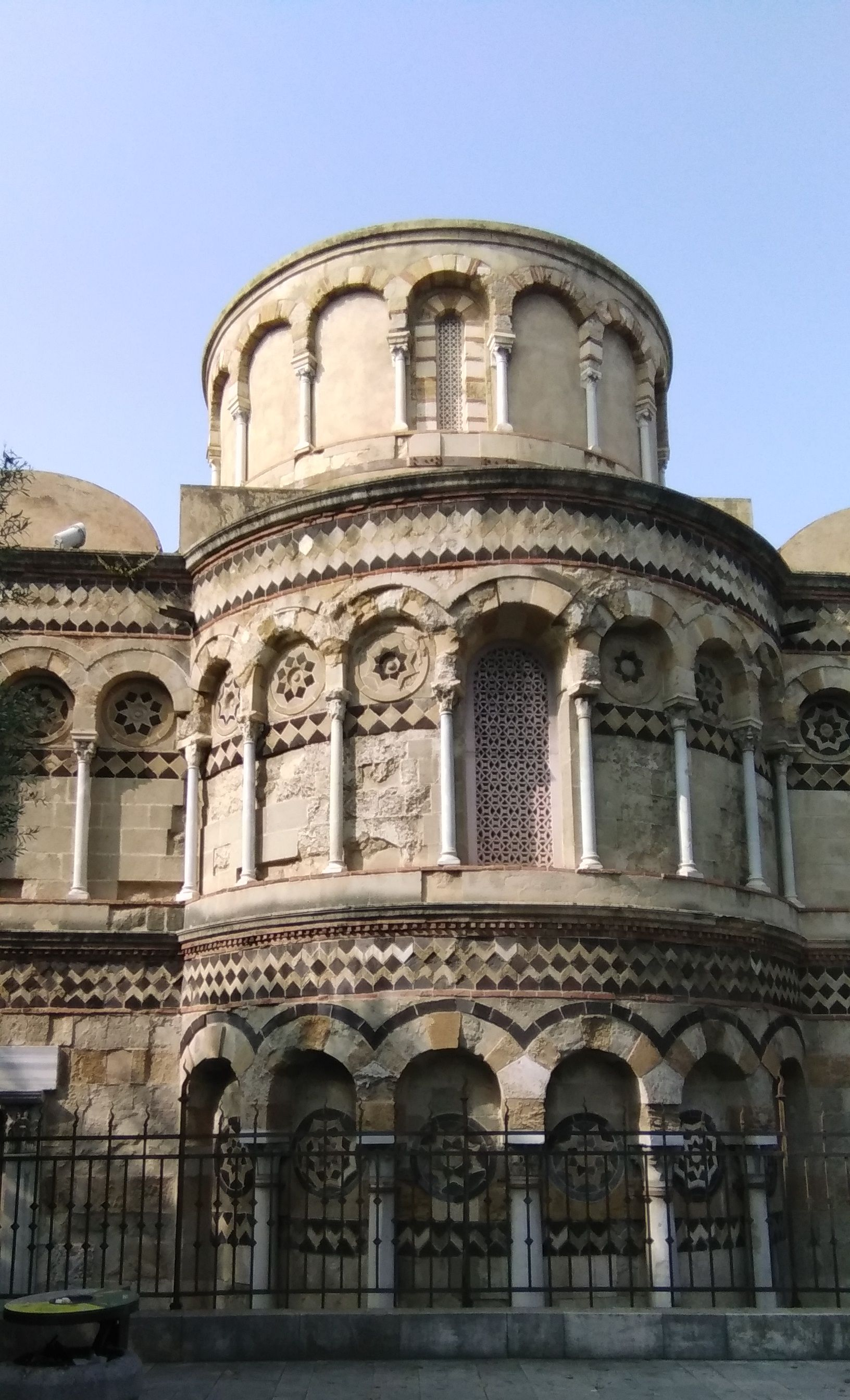
The church's well-preserved apse facing Via Garibaldi

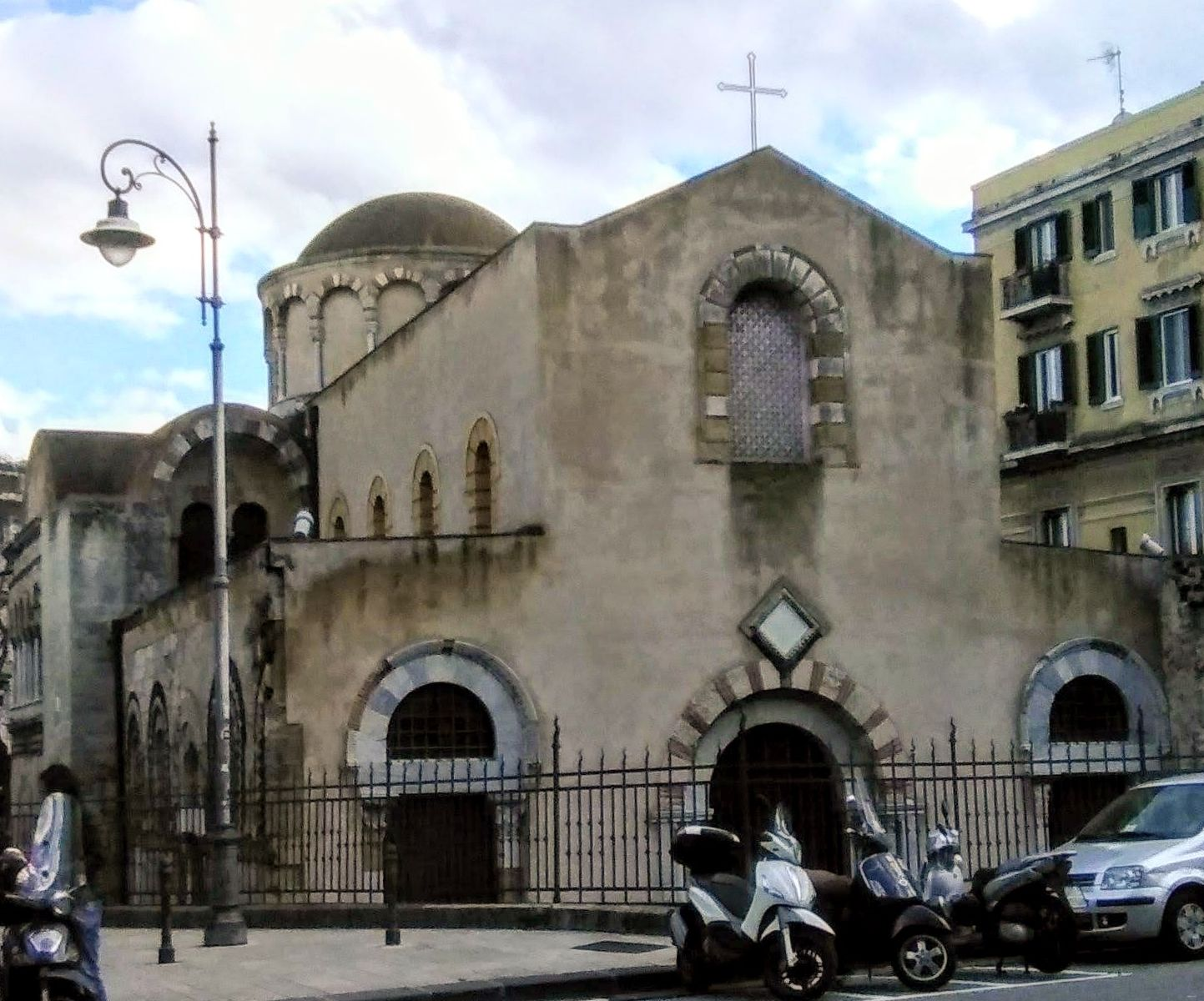
Façade of the church. Fronting Via Cesare Battisti

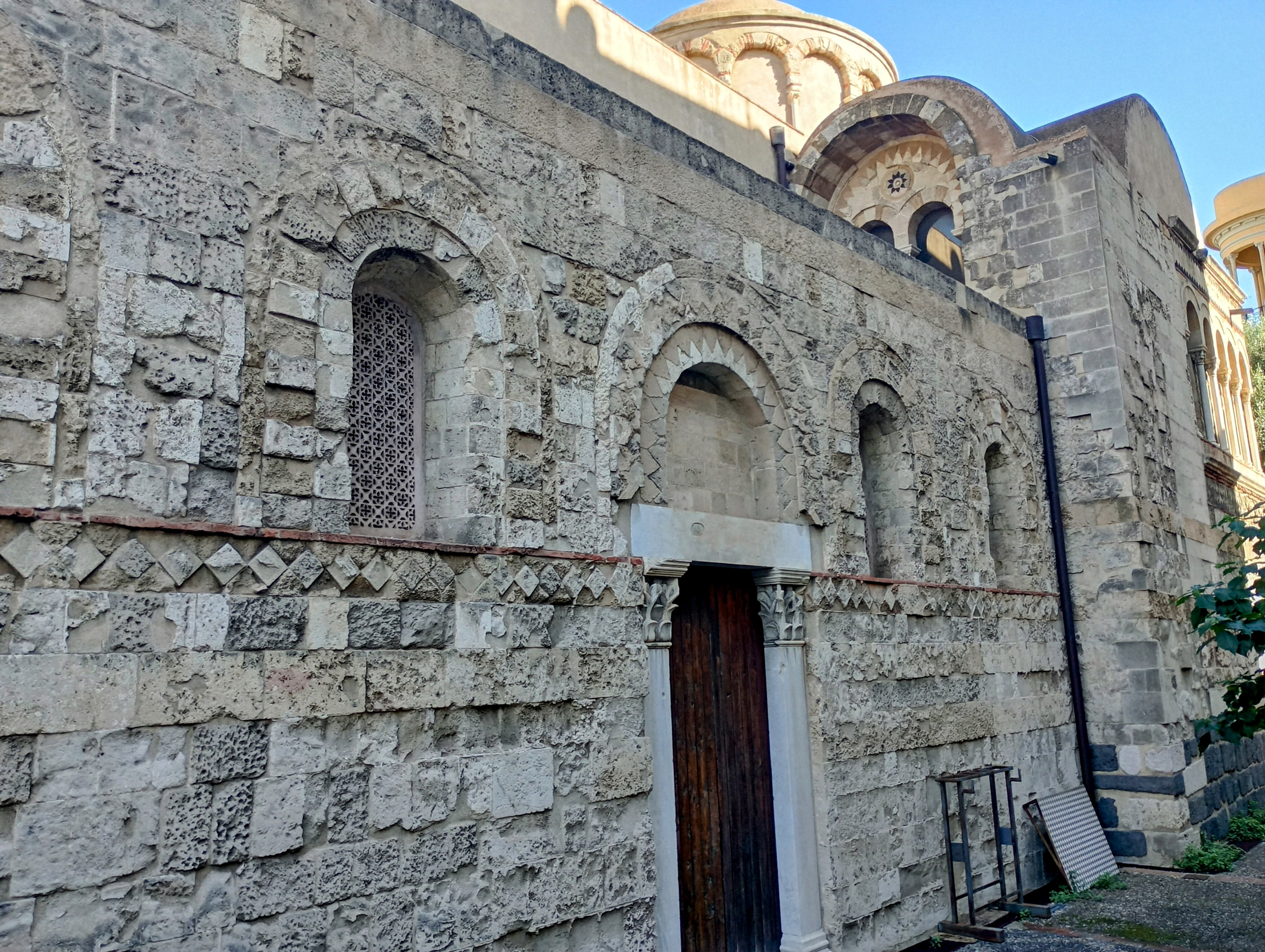
Side entrance facing south

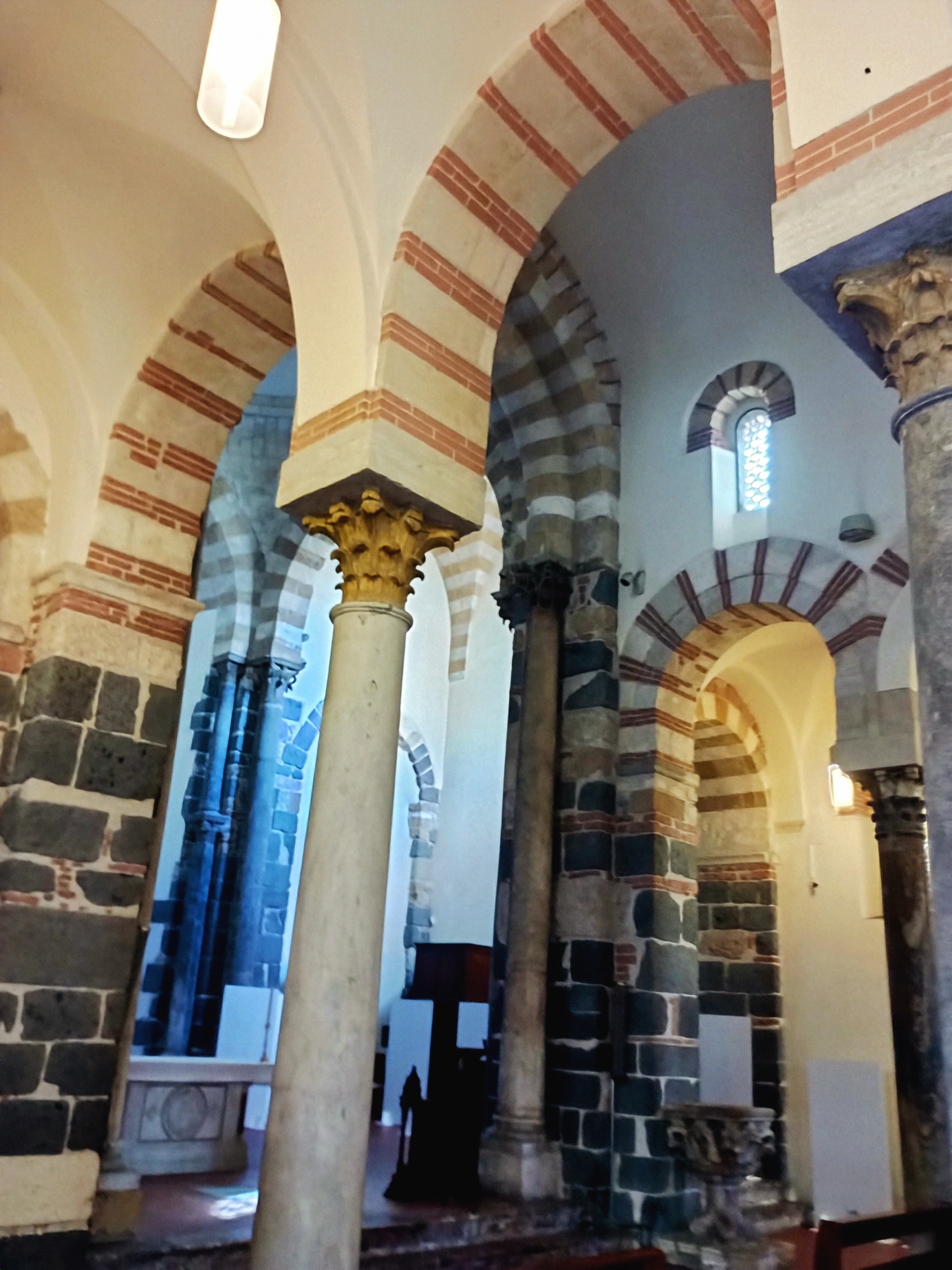
Interior of the church

== See also ==
- Norman-Arab-Byzantine culture
