= SS Afonwen =

Cargo steamer

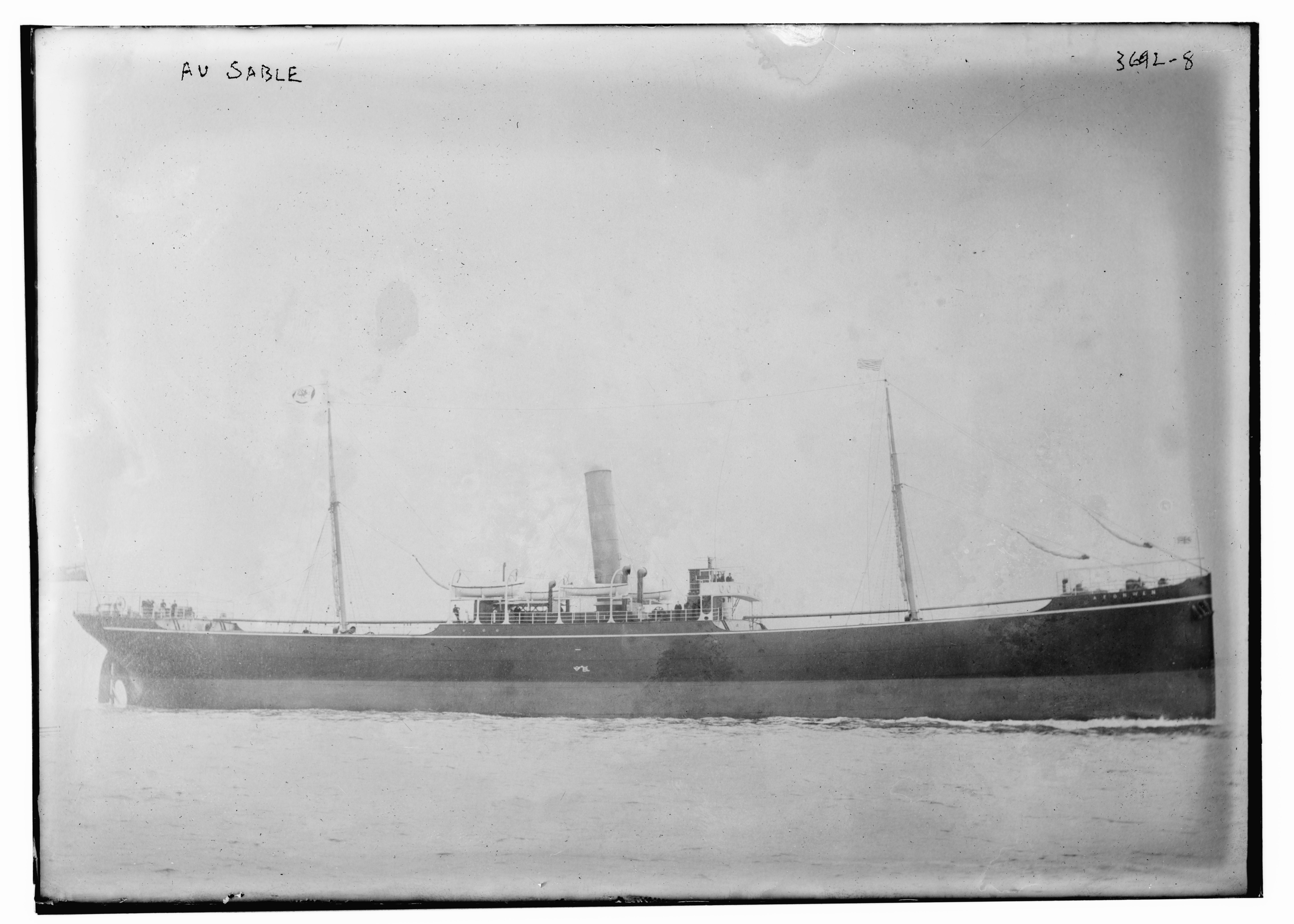

SS Afonwen was a cargo steamer with a long and varied history of ownership. It was launched on 11 August 1897, having been constructed at Yard No: 326 of John Readhead & Sons Ltd in South Shields, England.

The ship had a gross register tonnage of 3,324 and dimensions of 99.4 by 14.4 metres (326 ft × 47 ft). Its power was one 3-cylinder triple-expansion steam engine, single shaft and one screw. The vessel had a cargo capacity of 5,500 long tons (5,600 t).

== Ownership ==
Year	Shipping Company	Notes
09/1897	Afonwen Steamship Co Ltd (W & CT Jones), Cardiff	
1904	W & CT Jones Steamship Co Ltd, Cardiff	
1912	EC Embiricos, Andros	renamed LEONIDAS CAMBANIS
1915	A/S D/S Gotland, Copenhagen	renamed GOTLAND
1915	Muskegon SS Corp, New York	renamed MUSKEGON
1918	Foreign Transport & Mercantile Corp, New York	
1919	American Transatlantic Co Inc, New York	
1920	Foreign Transport & Mercantile Corp, New York	
1921	American Transatlantic Co Inc, New York	
1922	Muskegon SS Corp, New York	
1923	Foreign Transport & Mercantile Corp, New York	
1924	A/S D/S Kirsten Jensen, Copenhagen	renamed KIRSTEN JENSEN
1925	Unknown owner, Genoa	renamed AFONWEN

== Messina Earthquake ==
The ship played an important role in rescuing survivors of the 1908 Messina Earthquake. The SS Afonwen, captained by William Owen, was in Messina harbour during the earthquake on a voyage carrying coal. This event was accompanied by a very significant tsunami. The master's entry (official number 105191) for December 1908 records the event:

At 5.15 all hands disturbed by heavy earthquake shock causing great confusion on board, rushing on deck but being pitched dark and the air full of dust was unable to see anything; same time tidal wave came over quay which raised the ship bodily tearing adrift all moorings… unknown steamer which was adrift collided with our starboard bow damaging same… the water now receded and ship grounded… At 7 a.m. sky cleared when we found out the quay had collapsed and town destroyed…

One member of the crew, Ali Hassan, was reported as being ashore at the time and the entry against his name in the crew list gives him as "…supposed killed in earthquake".

After the first effects had passed the crew headed ashore to rescue survivors. Having seen some children trapped on the fifth floor of a crumbling building, a team went in to fetch them out, rescuing 12 children and woman. Able Seaman Henry Smith and Second Mate James Vivian Reed were awarded the Albert Medal by King Edward VII in 1909.

The effect of the quake and tsunami on the harbour floor is evidenced by the fact that the ship was anchored in 45 fathoms (270 ft; 82 m) of water before the quake, but there were only 30 fathoms (180 ft; 55 m) when she sailed, loaded with refugees, to Naples.

== Fate ==
The ship, carrying a load of pulpwood, caught fire at Silverdale Green Bay, Newfoundland on 9 September 1924. She was later broken up at Genoa in September 1925.
