= Aragonese Castle (Reggio Calabria) =

Castle in Reggio Calabria, Calabria, Italy

Coordinates: 38.1055°N 15.6442°E

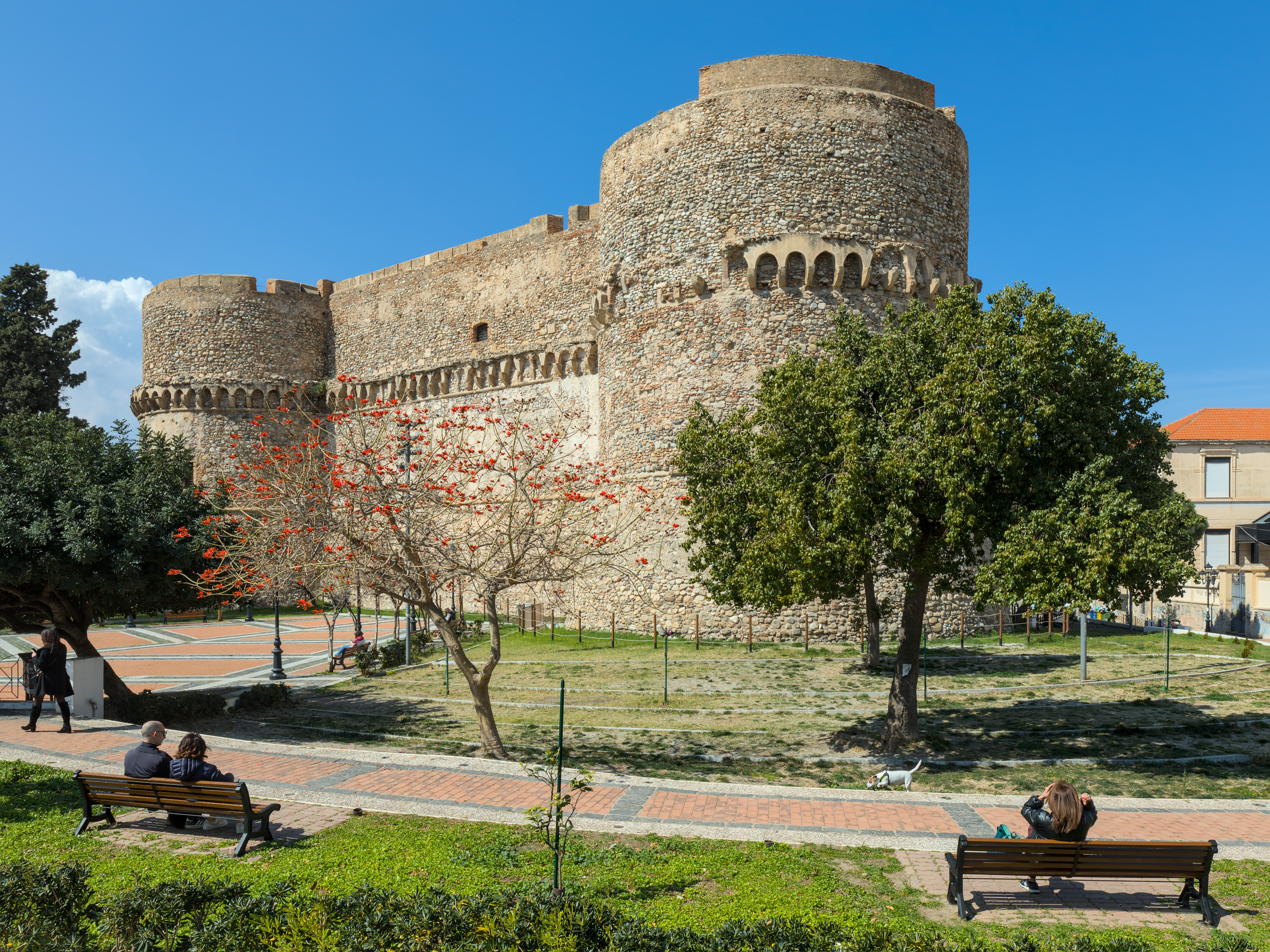
The castle

Aragonese Castle (Italian: Castello Aragonese) is a castle in Reggio Calabria enlarged to its current extent by Ferdinand I of Aragon.
