= Fontana del Pianto =

Monumental fountain in Rome, Italy

- Fountain
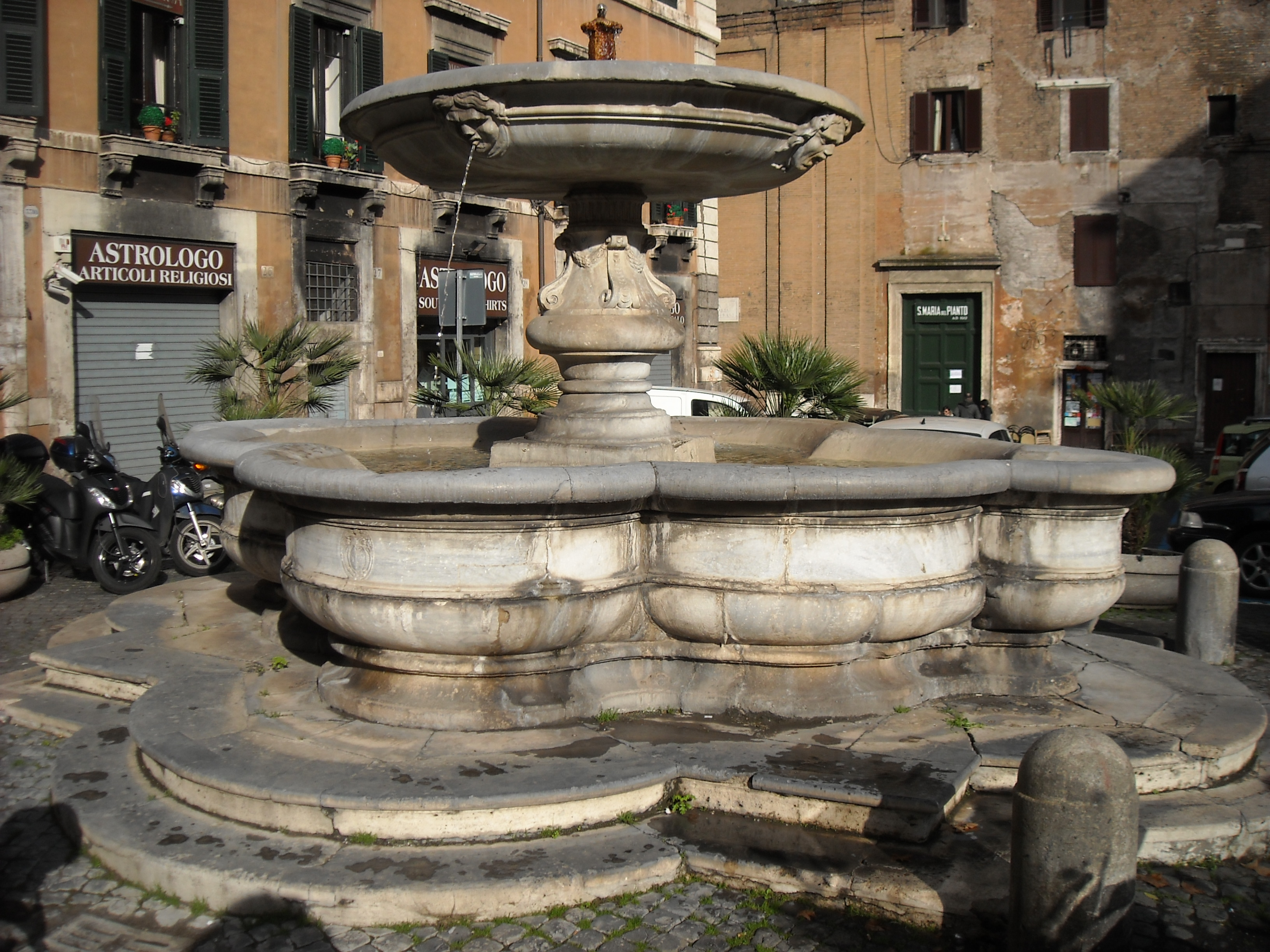
- Fontana del Pianto, Piazza delle Cinque Scole
- Design: Giacomo della Porta
- Location: Rome
- Interactive map of Fontana del Pianto
- Coordinates: 41°53′34″N 12°28′35″E

The Fontana del Pianto, also known as the Fontana di piazza delle Cinque Scole, is a monumental fountain located in the Piazza delle Cinque Scole in the rione of Regola in Rome.

== Name ==
The fountain presently takes its name from the church of Santa Maria del Pianto, whose southern entrance is located a few yards north. The fountain was moved here in 1930 under Pope Pius XI, from its prior location inside the former Roman Ghetto. It was located a few more yards north, near the northern entrance to the church of Santa Maria del Pianto.

== Design ==
The design of the marble fountain was commissioned by Pope Gregory XIII and is attributed to Giacomo della Porta, and completed by Pietro Gucci circa 1591–1593. It consists of a superior and lower basins with mascarons as spouts. The prior location, where the Via Santa Maria del Pianto becomes Via del Portico d'Ottavia, is marked in the street with white bricks. The fountain shares features, such as mascarons and simple basins with another of Della Porta's fountains: the Fontana di Piazza d'Aracoeli.

Preceded by Fontana del Pantheon	Landmarks of Rome; Fontana del Pianto	Succeeded by Fontana di Piazza d'Aracoeli
