= Palazzo Albertoni Spinola =

Building in Rome, Italy

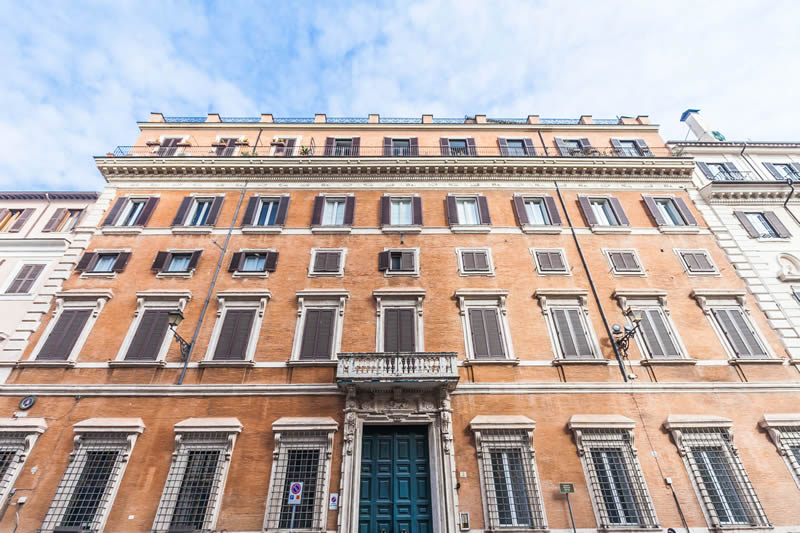
- Interactive map of the Palazzo Albertoni Spinola area

General information
- Architectural style: Renaissance architecture
- Location: Rome, Italy, Campitelli Square, 2
- Coordinates: 41.89321°N 12.479530°E
- Construction started: 1580
- Completed: 1616

Technical details
- Floor count: 4

References
- Giacomo Della Porta and Girolamo Rainaldi

The Albertoni Spinola Palace, with entrances in Campitelli square n. 2, Capizucchi square and vicolo Capizucchi is located in the 10th District (Rione Campitelli). It was projected and executed by Giacomo Della Porta and Girolamo Rainaldi around the end of 16th century and the first years of 17th century.

The building is protected by Italian Government and the distinctive feature of Palace consist in two buildings connected to each other but perfectly integrated that have generated the visual effect of the perspective on the Church of Santa Maria in Campitelli.

== History ==
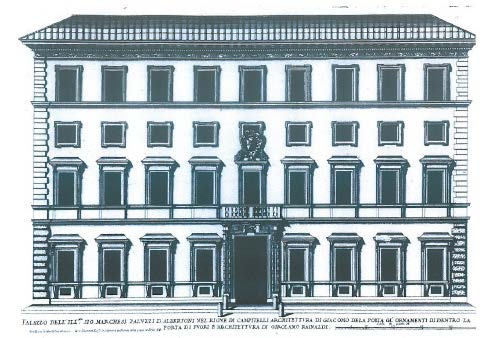
Palace Albertoni Facade (1620 ca.)

The work was commissioned by Marquis Baldassarre Paluzzi Albertoni initially to Giacomo della Porta (1532-1602), then continued and completed by Girolamo Rainaldi (1570-1655), in an area between the buildings De Rossi (later Cavalletti) and Capizucchi. The work is the fruit of the work of the two great Renaissance architects who collaborated on several occasions and on various occasions through various papal commissions.

In 1603, Knight Baldassarre Paluzzi Albertoni requested a permit to build the new facade, widening the area of the existing property towards the square and aligning the new wall with the corner of the adjacent Capizucchi palace. In 1616, he required an additional permit to construct, over the back door of his palace and over the alley, an archway to allow passage to his "nearest neighbors" (this is the archway built in the back, in the outside of the building, at the height of the first floor). So it is possible that the two buildings belonged to the same owner from the beginning, and then passed from one family to another. Moreover, it is plausible that the facade was created at another time – on an already existing renovated building – as witnessed by cartographers of the era: Cartaro, Du Peràc, and Tempesta, whose maps indicate already existing houses in that area. In addition, what also possibly indicates these two phases is the different alignment of the interior: it is orthogonal to the courtyard and to the sides of the adjacent palaces, but it is off-axis with respect to the front of the square. In fact, the entrance gallery of the building forms a diagonal connection between the square and the inner courtyard.

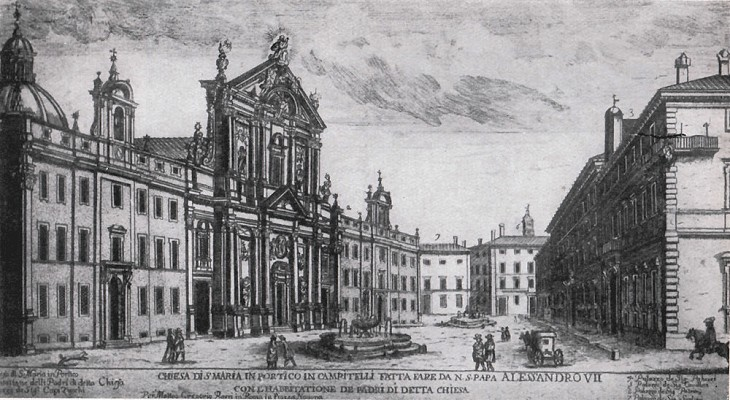
Campitelli square (1660 ca)

The presence of the Albertoni family is recorded in Campitelli square: the family's coat-of-arms, the lion passant is to be found on the old fountain (1587–89) as well as in the palace, above the entrance, over the lintels and niches along the stairs and in the frieze below the cornice of the main facade where we see lions passant with roe deer. Some of the minor palaces of the Paluzzi Albertoni family in Margana square, as well as under n. 36 of Via de' Delfini, were connected to the larger palace, both structurally and functionally. The heirs of the Paluzzi Albertoni family adopted on October 21, 1671 the surname and the arms of the Altieris together with the title of Princes by desire of Emilio Altieri (1590-1676) elevated to the Papacy in 1670 under the name of Clement X. Thus all the riches of the Altieris passed on to the descendants of the Paluzzi Albertoni family renamed as Altieri. In fact, the Palace of Piazza Campitelli turned out to be a less prestigious residence than the palace built by the Altieri al Gesù family which, together with the villa at the Lateran, was to host the works of art of the family.

The Palace in Piazza Campitelli, remaining at the hands of the renewed offspring of the Altieris for more than a century was elevated with a fourth floor on top of the attic, and was sold in 1808 approximately by Prince Paluzzo Altieri to the Spanish politician Manuel Godoy y Alvares de Faria Ríos Sánchez Zarzosa, Prince of the Peace, Prince of Bassano (1767-1851). Somewhat later, the building was handed over to Cardinal Bartolomeo Pacca (1756-1844) who lived there from time to time at least from 1819. Upon Pacca's death, the palace of Piazza Campitelli belonged to his grandchildren for about fifty years, who rented parts of it out to their acquaintances, including Cardinals Giacomo Piccolomini and Giacomo Antonelli.

Subsequently, in 1886 the building was sold by the descendants of Pacca to Countess Carolina Portalupi (1852-1891), who restored it, leaving it to her direct descendants, the Genoese Marquis Spinola [Maria Antonietta Spinola was later to marry the well-known politician Mario Cingolani (1883- 1971), while Bonifacio Spinola married his second cousin, Countess Marina Baldeschi (1895-1983)]. The restoration of the Palace could not be postponed further since the complex was in a poor state of repair as a result of years of neglect: the works concerned mainly parts of the courtyard, the stairs, and the interiors. Walls were consolidated; arches, vaulted ceilings, and floors were reinforced or rebuilt; the eaves, roofs and terraces were repaired; the stairs and the floors of the landings of the main staircase were completely renewed; and many ceilings were renovated – especially the decorated ones – as were the upholstery of the interior walls, with doors and windows. There are also some interventions documented in relation to a more proper distribution of water and the renovation of the bathrooms. This period also witnessed the construction of the new glass-covered gallery on the south-east, and probably the cant of the third floor towards Palazzo Cavalletti. The work was substantial, but left the structure of the building unchanged.

In 2006 and 2007 some conservative restoration work was carried out and the Palace is now in so good conditions that deserves this kind of masterpiece.

== Features and description ==
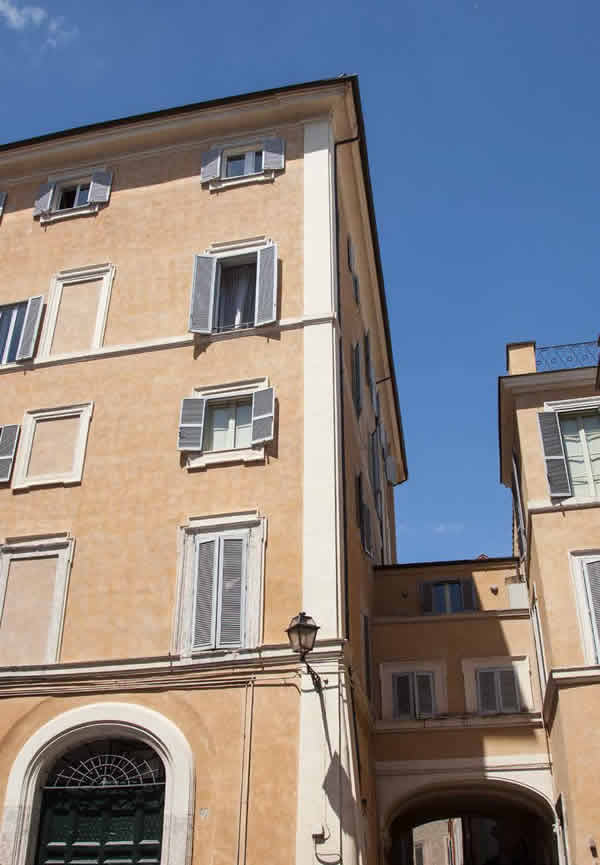
The connection between the two bodies of the building (view from Capizucchi square)

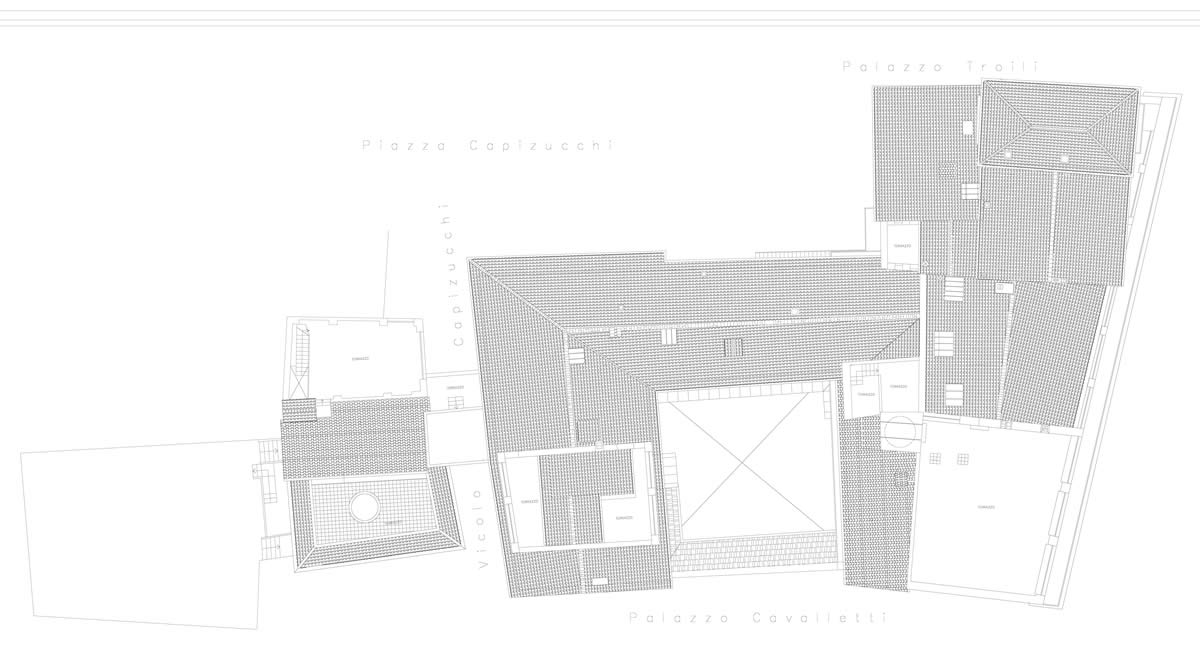
The floor plan of the building: the two bodies(Palazzo and Palazzetto) and the "secret" roof garden connected by the overbridge

Giacomo Della Porta worked on the construction of the building by acting on the load-bearing structures and internal partitions from last years of 1500 until his death in 1602, after which Girolamo Rainaldi, who from 1592 collaborated with the Maestro., inherited the task of redoing and realign the facade of the building with the new layout of the square. This creates the millimeter perspective obtained from the entrance door of the Palazzetto through the orthogonality of the entrance gallery with the facade of the palace overlying to the existing buildings already present at least since 1593 as the cartography of the time shows. The integration of the two buildings is allowed by the position of the openings of the rear part of the Palazzo Grande, which are aligned with those of the Palazzetto behind and not modified by the façade works started in 1603. As can be seen from the licenses obtained by the owners respectively 1603 and 1616, the first to redo the aforementioned façade of the palace on Piazza Campitelli, the second to build the overpass connecting the two properties, these did not provide for other demolition and reconstruction works of the structures. Even the hanging garden is aligned with the flyover doors both towards the first floor landing of the Palazzo Grande and towards the first floor of the Palazzetto. The façade and the external decorations of the Palazzo Grande are by Rainaldi with an exquisitely manneristic invention, while the immediate inheritance received by Della Porta provided for the general form of the compact and traditional construction and generates the orthogonality of the internal entrance gallery. The subsequent construction of the overpass completes the integrative intentions derived from the astounding perspective of the Palazzetto, giving life over time, to an architectural masterpiece that could only emerge so perfect in the execution of the execution by the collaboration of two geniuses.

== Special visual effects ==
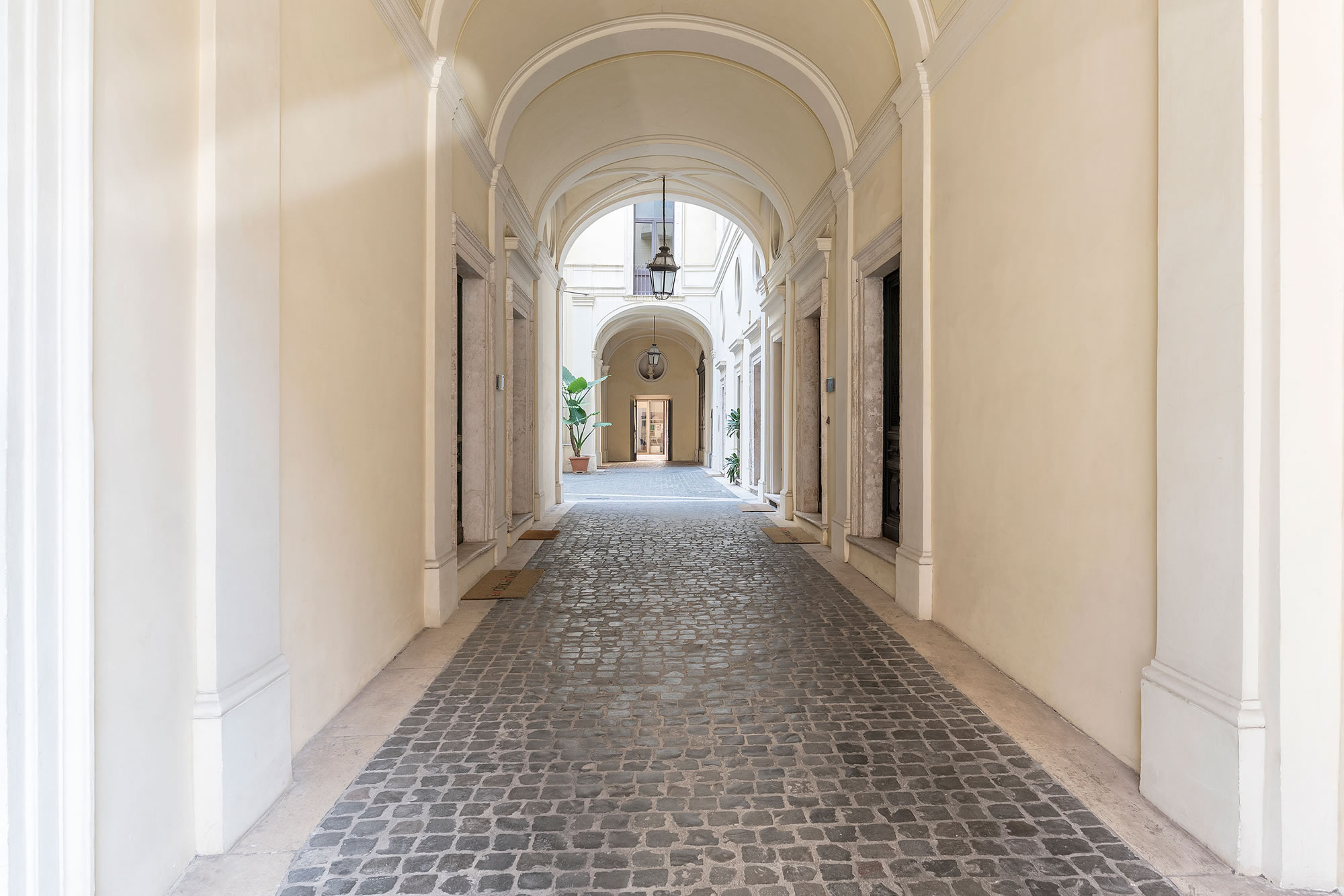
The entrance gallery and the perspective(view from the Santa Maria in Campitelli Church Main door)

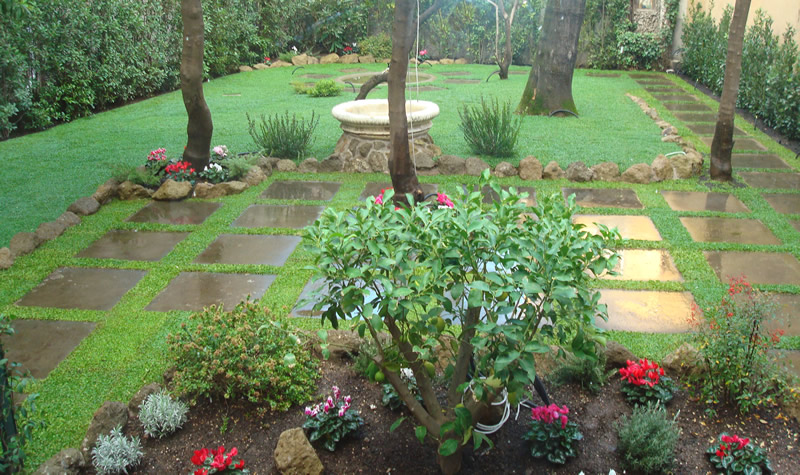
The "secret" roof garden

The perspective vision that is obtained creates a sort of apparently inexplicable optical effect. In fact, moving backwards from the main entrance door of the Palace, the front entrance of the Church of Santa Maria in Campitelli begins to "move" from left to right until it coincides perfectly only when you reach the threshold of the door of the Palazzetto. It is necessary to underline that at the time of planning the facade of the current Church had not yet been built and that the birthplace of Blessed Ludovica Albertoni, the true spiritual authority of the family, was located on the same site. The Paluzzi Albertoni had therefore probably wanted to keep the view from door to door to keep a constant memory of the Blessed. A part of the perimeter wall of the house of the Blessed is still visible with an ancient fresco inside the Chapel of the Albertoni family in Santa Maria in Campitelli.

Another effect produced is the loss of "orientation" within the two buildings: in fact, visiting the rooms from the inside, it is not fully realized if its position is in the large body of the Palace or in the other smaller, so called Palazzetto. A further visual peculiarity is that concerning the "secret" hanging garden, visible from the entrance of the flyover to the first floor of the Palazzo grande, although it is "hidden", as a rear offshoot of the first floor of the Palazzetto and therefore far from the square.

== Other sculptures in the Palace ==
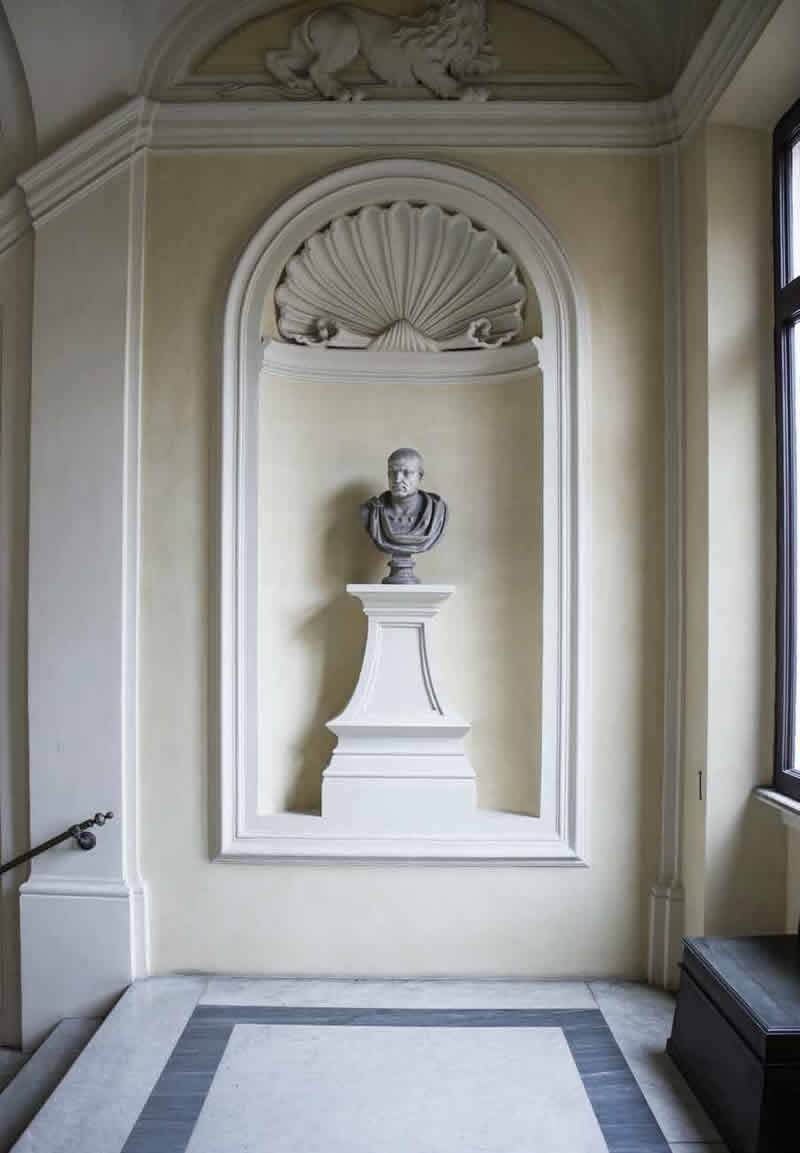
Head of a priest of Isis reworked as "Publius Scipio Africanus"

In the Palace there is still a small collection of six portrayed heads – one in the entrance hall past the courtyard and the other five over the stairs – which were part of the collection of the Albertoni Paluzzi family, collectors of ancient artwork. The Paluzzi Albertoni collection was merged in the 1600s with the remarkable Altieri collection, enriching the family mansion and other properties including villas on the Esquilino and at Porta Salaria. The busts to be found today in the Albertoni Spinola palace are "two ancient marble heads – one of a young woman and one of Antinous – mended in part; another ancient marble head – a priest of Isis – reworked in the Renaissance era as a portrait of Publius Cornelius Scipio Africanus; two marble portraits reconstructed during the Renaissance era – one of Julius Caesar and another probably of Hesiod or Zeno of Elea – and a plaster cast of the head of Julius Caesar (probably of the Pacca and not of the Paluzzi family) taken from the statue preserved in the Senatorial Palace on the Capitoline Hill
