= Santi Venanzio e Ansovino =

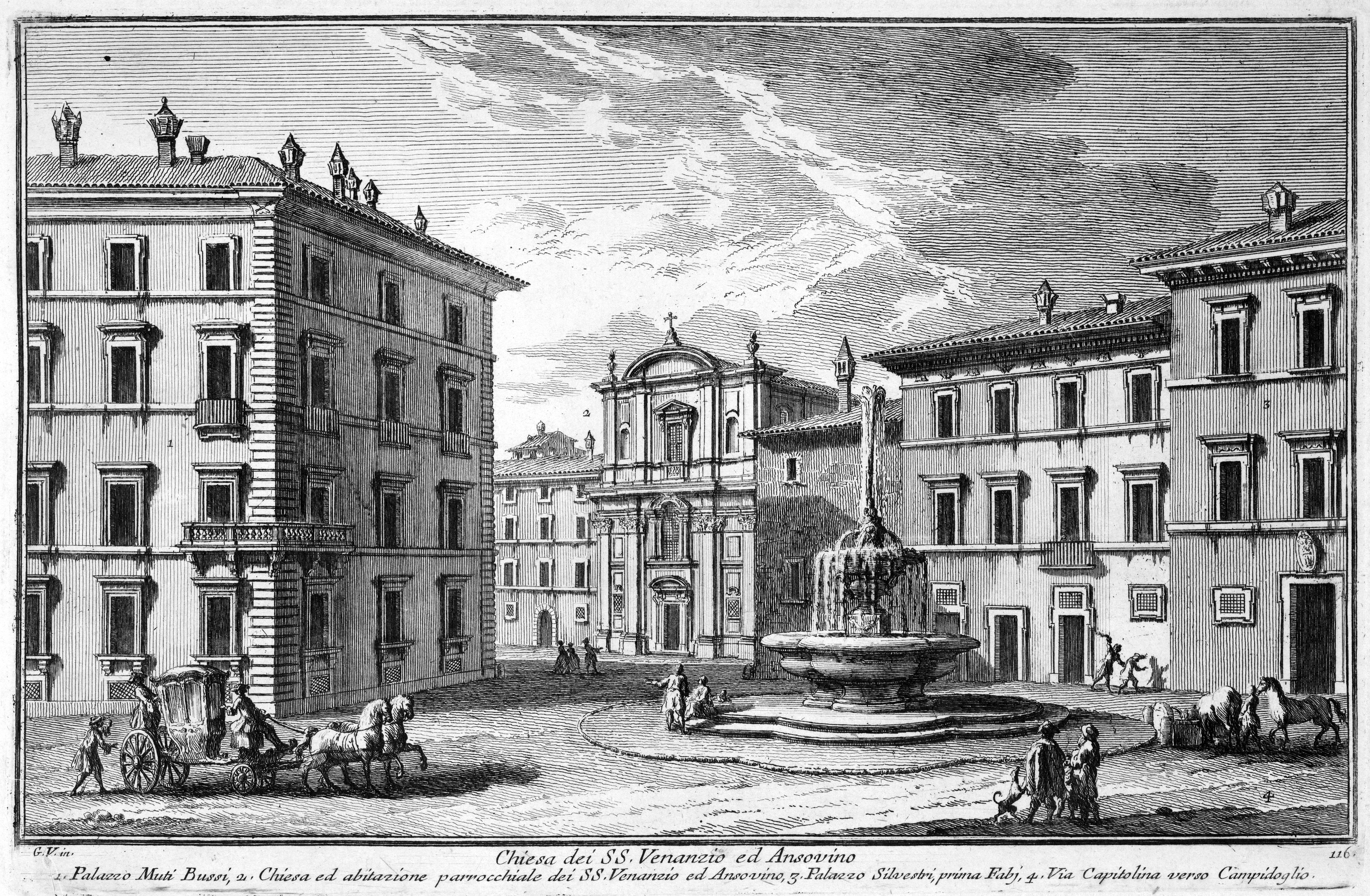
- Santi Venanzio e Ansovino and Fountain of the Piazza d'Aracoeli in a print by Giuseppe Vasi
- Click on the map for a fullscreen view
- 41°53′41″N 12°28′52″E
- Location: near Capitoline Hill, Rome
- Country: Italy
- Denomination: Roman Catholic

History
- Dedication: Venantius of Camerino, Ansovinus

Architecture
- Functional status: Demolished in 1928

Santi Venanzio e Ansovino was a Roman Catholic church situated near the Capitoline Hill in Rome, in the area now occupied by the Piazza d'Aracoeli. It was dedicated to two saints associated with the city of Camerino: Venantius of Camerino, a martyr; and Ansovinus, bishop of Camerino. The church was also called SS Venanzio ed Ansovino de' Camerinesi.

== Description ==
The original church at the site was named San Giovanni Battista in Mercatello, after a marketplace here, moved later to Piazza Navona. In 1542, Pope Paul III granted the church to a confraternity, and later to Basilian Monks from the Abbey of Grottaferrata. They in turn ceded it to the Confraternity of the Camerinesi. Under their ownership, Antonio Liborio Raspantini refurbished the church. The main altar was designed by Giovanni Battista Contini, and the main altarpiece by Luigi Garzi. Side paintings were by Agostino Masucci. The ceiling of the apse was frescoed by Pasqualini. Garzi also painted a Virgin with Saints Charles and Phillip. Antonio Gherardi designed and decorated a chapel with a canvas depicting St Anne. The chapel also had a Birth of the Virgin by Michelangiolo Cerruti, and a painting by Antonio Grecolini.

The Fontana di Piazza d'Aracoeli is featured prominently in the print by Giuseppe Vasi depicting the facade of this church; the fountain was designed in 1589 by Giacomo della Porta. The church however was pulled down in 1928 to make for new roads and a piazza adjacent to the Altare della Patria.
