= Fontana del Pantheon =

Fountain in Piazza della Rotonda, Rome, Italy

- Fountain
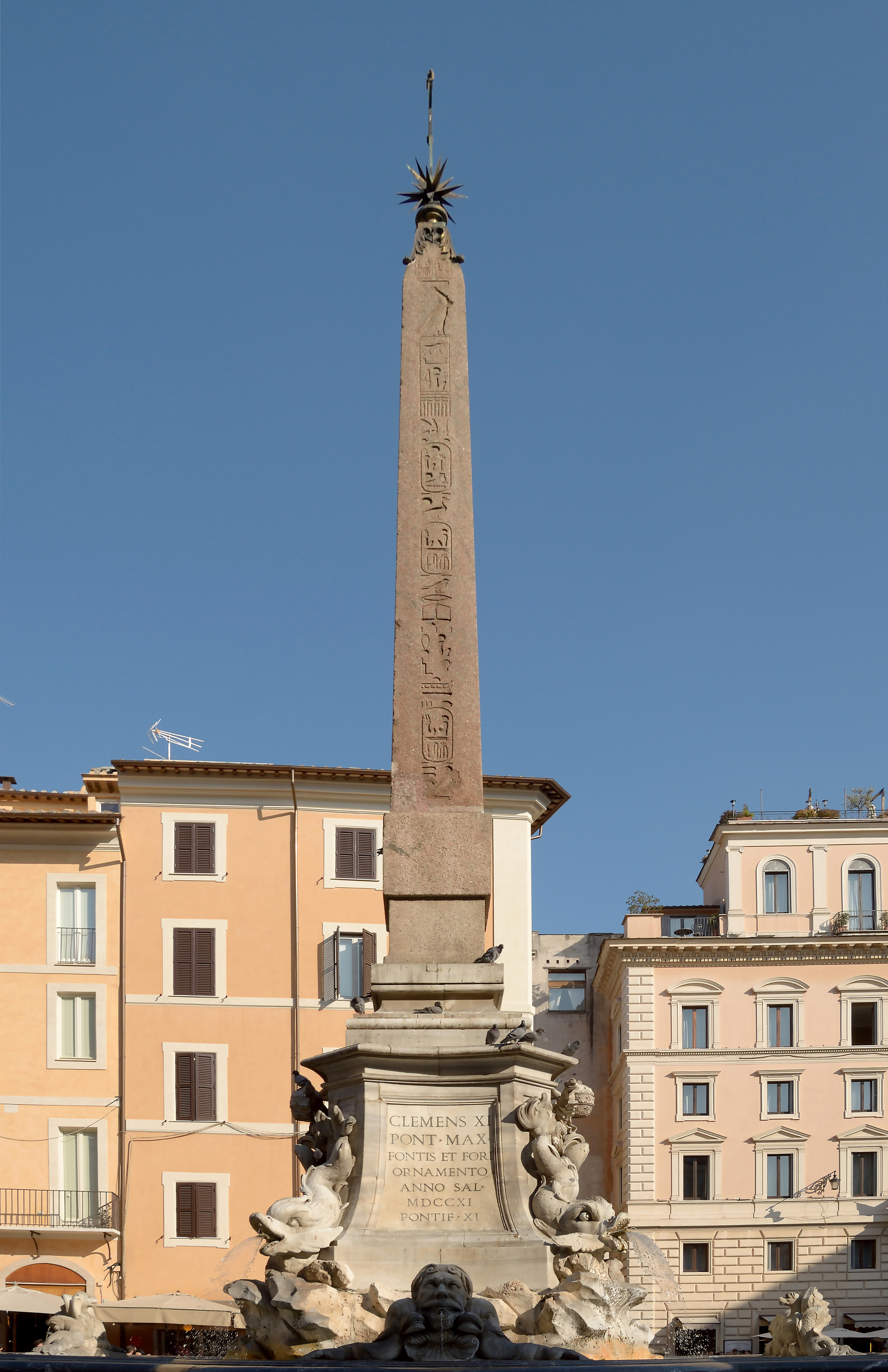
- The Fontana del Pantheon at Piazza della Rotonda features the six-metre Pantheon obelisk
- Design: Giacomo Della Porta
- Location: Piazza della Rotonda, Rome, Italy
- Interactive map of Fontana del Pantheon
- Coordinates: 41°53′57.15″N 12°28′36″E

The Fontana del Pantheon (English: Fountain of the Pantheon) was commissioned by Pope Gregory XIII and is located in the Piazza della Rotonda, Rome, in front of the Roman Pantheon. It was designed by Giacomo Della Porta in 1575 and sculpted out of marble by Leonardo Sormani.

== History ==
In 1711, Pope Clement XI requested that the fountain be modified and had Filippo Barigioni design a new layout, which included a different basin, made of stone, and the Macuteo obelisk, created during the period of Ramses II, set in the centre on a plinth with four dolphins decorating the base.

In 1886, the original marble figures were removed, and replaced with copies by Luigi Amici. Today, the originals can be seen in the Museum of Rome.

Fontana del Pantheon served as a model for Francesco Robba's Robba fountain, which stands at Town Square in Ljubljana, the capital of Slovenia. It is one of the city's most recognisable symbols.

== Restoration ==
In April 2018 James Pallotta offered to donate €230,000 towards the restoration the fountain and also the fontana dei Leoni in Piazza del Popolo.

Preceded by Fontana del Nettuno, Piazza del Popolo	Landmarks of Rome; Fontana del Pantheon	Succeeded by Fontana del Pianto
