= Girolamo Rainaldi =

Italian architect (1570–1655)

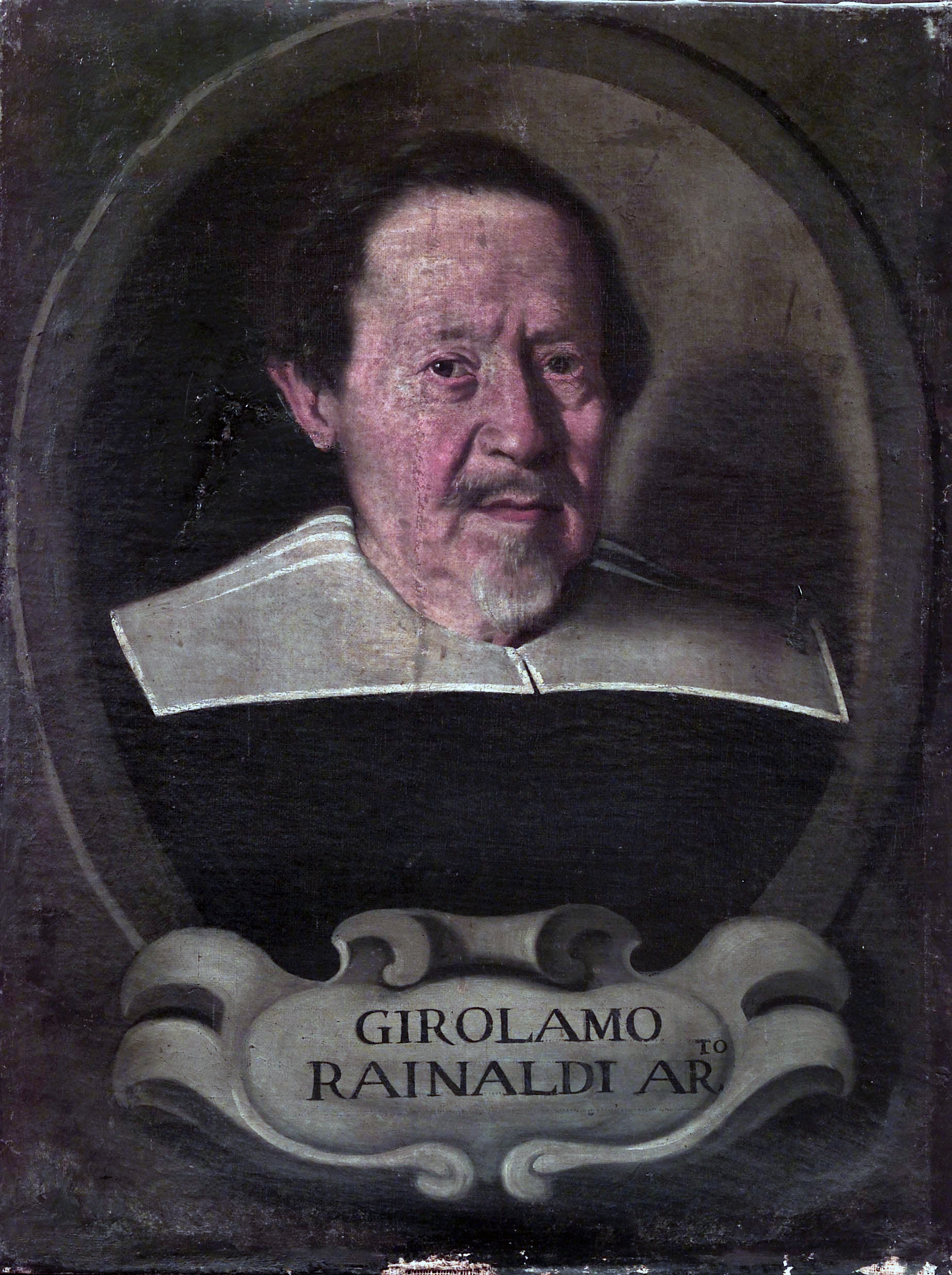
- A self portrait of Girolamo Rainaldi
- Born: 4 May 1570, Rome
- Died: 15 July 1655, Rome
- Known for: Renaissance architecture

Girolamo Rainaldi (4 May 1570 – 15 July 1655) was an Italian architect who worked mainly in a conservative Mannerist style, often with collaborating architects. He was a successful competitor of Bernini. His son, Carlo Rainaldi, became an even more notable, more fully Baroque architect.

== Biography ==
The son of a painter from Norcia, Rainaldi was born in Rome.

He trained with the architect-engineer Domenico Fontana and collaborated as a junior partner with Giacomo Della Porta, whom he succeeded as the papacy's chief architect, as "officium architecti nobilis fabricae Capitolii Populi Romani". He completed too Palazzo Albertoni Spinola projected from Giacomo Della Porta. He was constantly at work on lesser projects such as altars and church furnishings, and with on-going projects of other designers, especially at St Peter's and in completing Michelangelo's project at the Campidoglio with the Palazzo Nuovo discreetly designed to mirror Michelangelo's masterful Palazzo dei Conservatori.

Rainaldi's most influential single design was the façade of the Chiesa di Gesù e Maria; the project began in 1642, and was not completed before Rainaldi's death. In his official capacity Rainaldi also designed the palazzo to house the Jesuits in the Piazza del Gesù, a Mannerist façade without a trace of Baroque in its details. As the favored architect of Cardinal Pamphili, he temporarily eclipsed Bernini when this cardinal became Pope as Innocent X in 1644 and he became Papal architect of Rome in 1644.

The elder Rainaldi's important projects in Rome the Palazzo Pamphilj in Piazza Navona (c. 1645 – 1650), where he designed the ground plan of Sant'Agnese and laid its foundations beginning in 1652, but was replaced the following year by Francesco Borromini, who erected quite a different façade on Rainaldi's foundations; after Rainaldi's death his son Carlo was called in to replace Borromini.

He also designed the Tombs in Santa Cecilia in Trastevere and collaborated in the baroque setting of the gardens of Villa Borghese. In Rome, he was appointed Prince of the Academy of St. Luke for the year 1641.

The elder Rainaldi was all but house architect for the Farnese family. In the Farnese stronghold of Caprarola, near Rome, Cardinal Odoardo Farnese commissioned Rainaldi to build for the Discalced Carmelites the Church of SS Maria e Silvestro (1621–23), a beautiful and original church adapted to exigencies of the site. Cardinal Odoardo also commissioned the enriched interior of Santa Maria della Consolazione at Caprarola (that is similar to Santa Maria in Campitelli, projected later from his son Carlo Rainaldi). Rainaldi, who had adapted for the Farnese two monumental antique granite basins as matching fountains in Piazza Farnese in 1626, was taken to Parma by the Farnese to build their town palaces there, and also did the vaulting of Santissima Annunziata in that city.

Rainaldi was also active in Bologna, where he designed the vaulting to cover the vast and ambitious church of San Petronio (finished on-site by Francesco Martini), and designed the Church of Santa Lucia (1623). For Francesco d'Este, who, with the loss of the Este seat of Ferrara to the Papal States, concentrated his patronage in his Duchy of Modena, Rainaldi contributed to the construction of the Ducal Palace to supplant the ancient castello, and was in particular charged with the layout and elaborate hydraulics of its gardens, with giochi di acque and a theater clipped in green hedges, 1631-34 (Roganti).

Girolamo Rainaldi is modestly buried next to his father in the Church of Santi Luca e Martina; designed in part by Rainaldi's father, and part by Pietro da Cortona.
