= Carlo Rainaldi =

Italian architect

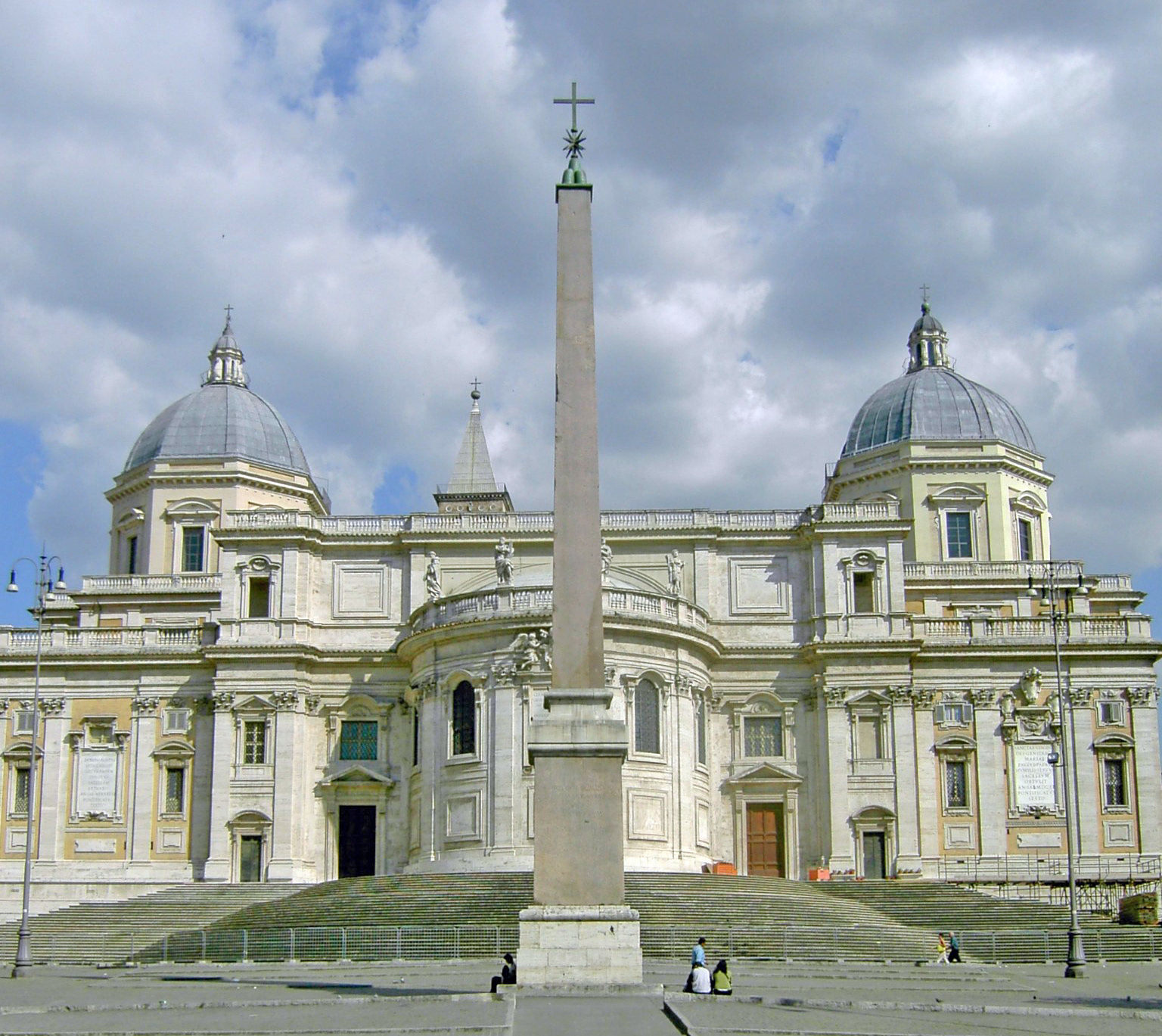
The apsidal part of Santa Maria Maggiore, one of Rainaldi's last works

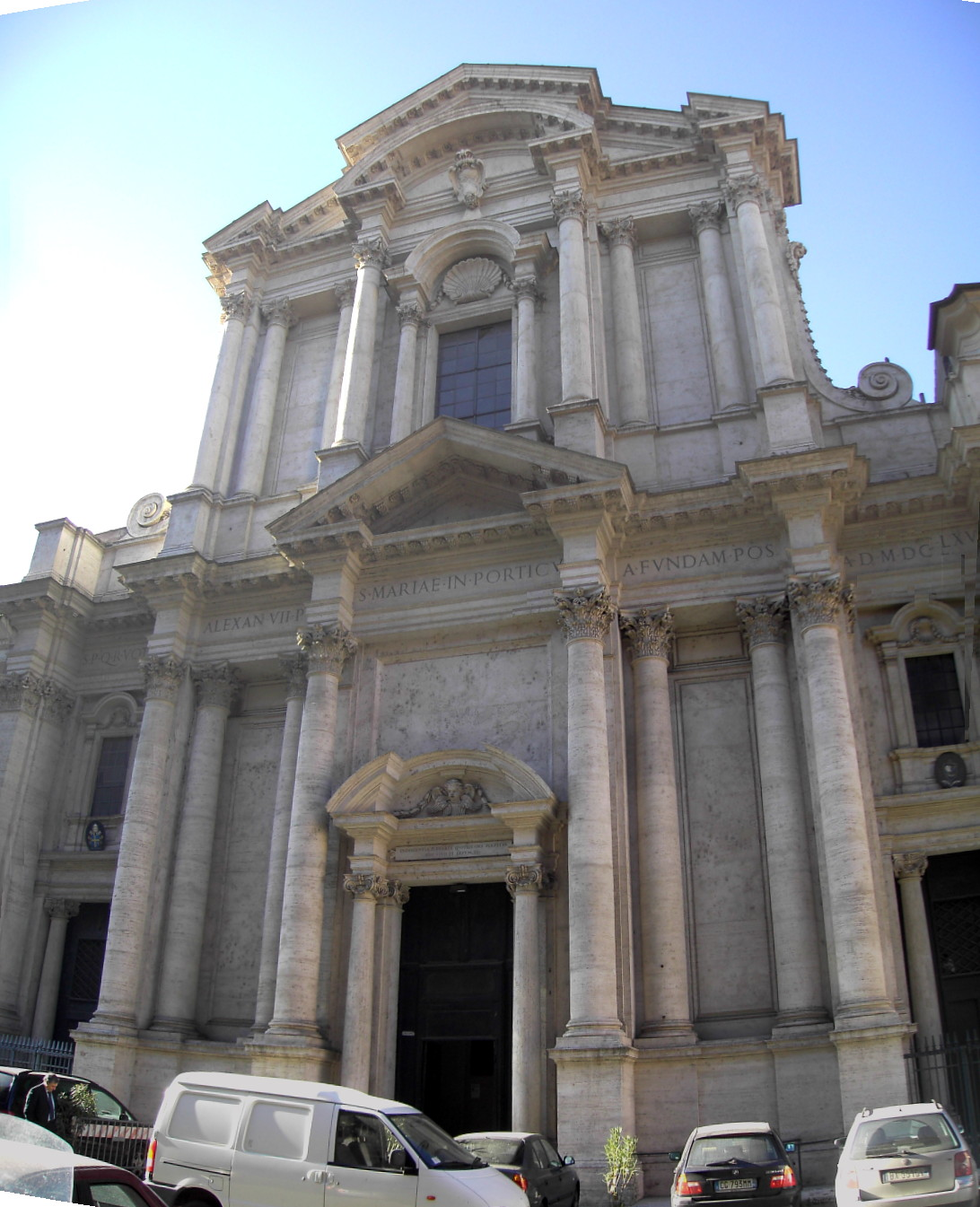
Façade of Santa Maria in Campitelli

Carlo Rainaldi (4 May 1611 – 8 February 1691) was an Italian architect of the Baroque period.

== Biography ==
Born in Rome, Rainaldi was one of the leading architects of 17th-century Rome, known for a certain grandeur in his designs. He worked at first with his father, Girolamo Rainaldi, a late Mannerist architect in Rome. After his father's death, he fully embraced the monumental Baroque style. He gained ascendancy in Rome when the Barberini pontificate of Pope Urban VIII was replaced by that of the more austere Pamphilj papacy of Innocent X. His works include the façade of Sant'Andrea della Valle (1661–1665), the façade of San Girolamo della Carità (1657}, the twin churches of Santa Maria dei Miracoli and Santa Maria in Montesanto, and Santa Maria in Campitelli (1663–1667). He was unable to complete the facade of Sant'Agnese in Agone during work in 1653–1657. The high altar of Santa Maria della Scala is by Rainaldi.

Beyond his work as an architect in stone, Rainaldi also designed stage sets for religious rituals and events. In 1650, he designed the sets for the Quarant'ore, or Forty Hours Devotion, held in the church of Il Gesù. In 1665, he designed a catafalque commemorating the death of Philip IV of Spain. He also was a composer.

Rainaldi died in Rome.

== Sources ==
- Fasolo, F. (1961). L'opera di Hieronimo e Carlo Rainaldi. Rome.
- Marchegiani, Cristiano (2016). "RAINALDI, Carlo". Dizionario Biografico degli Italiani (in Italian). Vol. 86: Querenghi–Rensi. Rome: Istituto dell'Enciclopedia Italiana. ISBN 978-88-12-00032-6.
