= Clementine Chapel =

Chapel beneath St. Peter's Basilica, Rome

The Clementine Chapel, also known as La Clementina, is a particular Roman Catholic chapel located within the underground necropolitan grottoes of Saint Peter's Basilica in Vatican City. It is believed to mark the site when Saint Peter was crucified. It is the area where the relics of St. Peter were venerated in early medieval times, before his skull was removed to be housed at the Archbasilica of St. John Lateran.

Open today for pilgrims, the site venerates the original pavonazzo marble monument placed there by Emperor Constantine, and was used in early medieval times to house the skull of St. Peter.

== History ==
Before the Clementine chapel was constructed, the skull of St. Peter was housed in its original resting place in the graffiti wall below the large tomb-like structure commissioned by emperor Constantine. The structure is visible behind the altar of the chapel.

The Clementine chapel was constructed c. 600 by the order of Pope Gregory, due to the original Constantinian monument not having a high altar; thus a new structure was constructed around the Constantinian monument. A more traditional high altar was constructed above it in order to celebrate Divine Liturgy, and the clementine chapel was constructed at the back to be used as a place for the veneration of the skull of St. Peter.

The chapel is named in honor of Pope Clement VIII as, in 1600, he commissioned Michelangelo and Giacomo Della Porta to decorate the chapel. He donated funds to install various religious mosaics that have been preserved to this day. Clement VIII used the chapel as his burial place.

== Features ==
It is one of the two main untouched areas of Old St. Peter's Basilica, along with the chapel of the Niche of the Pallia.

A notable feature of the chapel are the ornate bronze sculptures located in the chapel commemorating certain biblical scenes, along with its gilded cage in the central altar.

The vault was decorated by several artists including Luigi Vanvitelli, Giovanni Battista Maini, Ruggero Bescape and Alessandro de'Rossi.

According to a direct tour and interview granted to History Channel by the Archpriest of the Basilica, Cardinal Angelo Comastri, the chapel is the holiest site in the archaeological basilica.

The chapel itself is directly behind the present niche which is above the relics of St. Peter, thereby the site correlates to the present high altar of St. Peter's Basilica today.

The place where the recently discovered Bones of St. Peter are presently housed is not in the niche of the pallia, nor the clementine chapel but in their original resting place in the graffiti wall.

The skull of St. Peter which was first venerated in the clementine chapel, (after being moved there by pope Gregory during its construction), is now housed in the golden reliquary above the high altar of the Archbasilica of St. John Lateran, after being moved there in late medieval times.

Since 2021, the chapel has been used for celebrations of the Tridentine Mass, in the Vatican.
