= Fontana di Piazza d'Aracoeli =

Fountain in Rome, Italy

- Fountain
- {{{other_names}}}
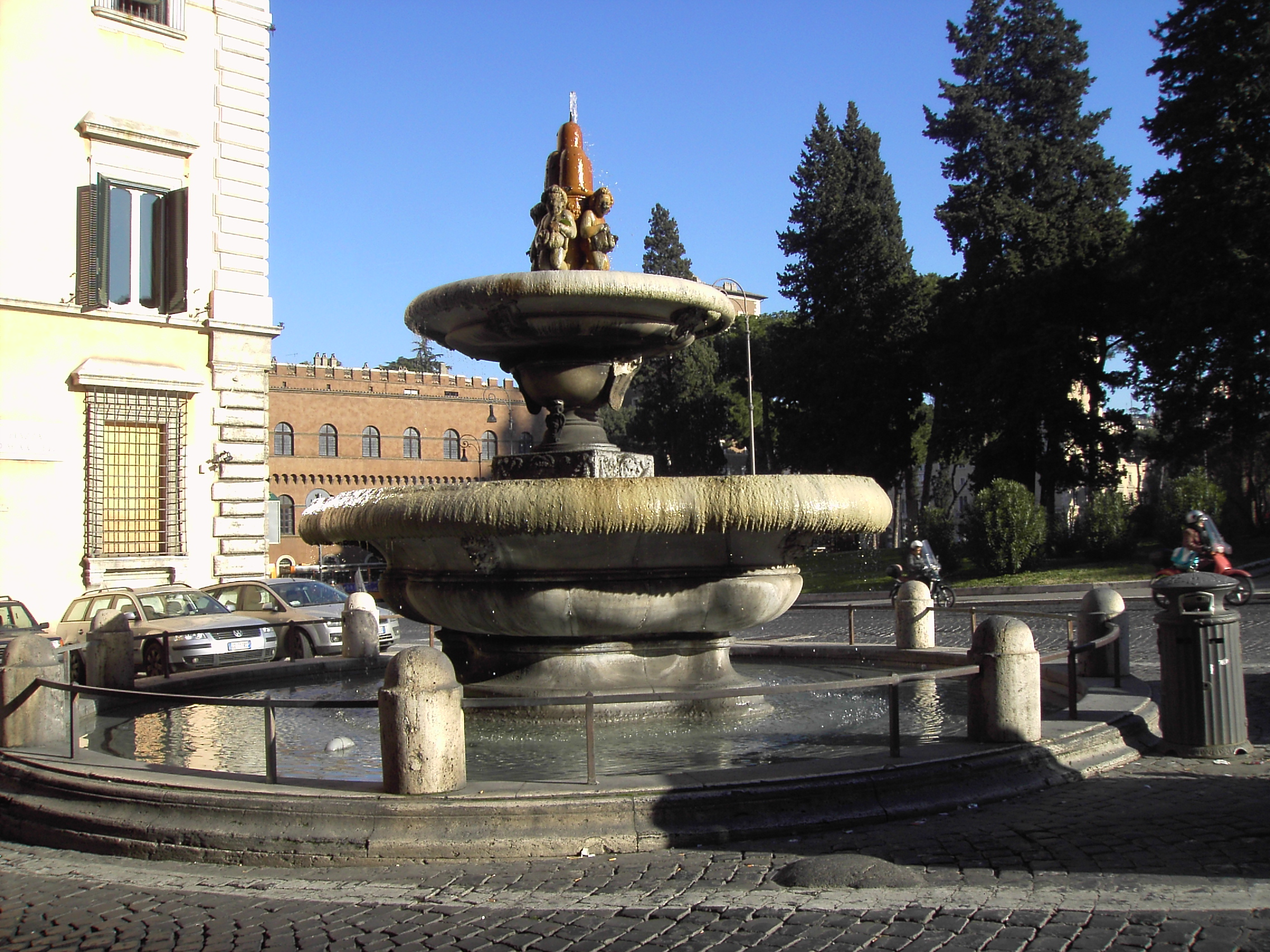
- Fountain of Piazza d'Aracoeli
- Design: Giacomo della Porta
- Location: Rome
- Interactive map of Fontana di Piazza d'Aracoeli
- Coordinates: 41°53′39.85″N 12°28′51.7″E

The fountain in the Piazza d'Aracoeli is a fountain in Rome, Italy, located at the base of the Capitoline Hill, in the little square with the same name.

== Description ==
It is one of the first and simplest of Renaissance fountains that would embellish the city. Two circular basins, capture the water, the top ringed by children pouring water from jugs, while above them is the heraldic symbol of the papal family. Commissioned by Pope Sixtus V in 1589, the fountain was designed by Giacomo della Porta and constructed by Andrea Brasca, Pietro Gucci and Pace Naldini. In front of the fountain, once stood the facade of Santi Venanzio e Ansovino, razed and now replaced with by the roads and park-space near the Altare della Patria.

== History ==
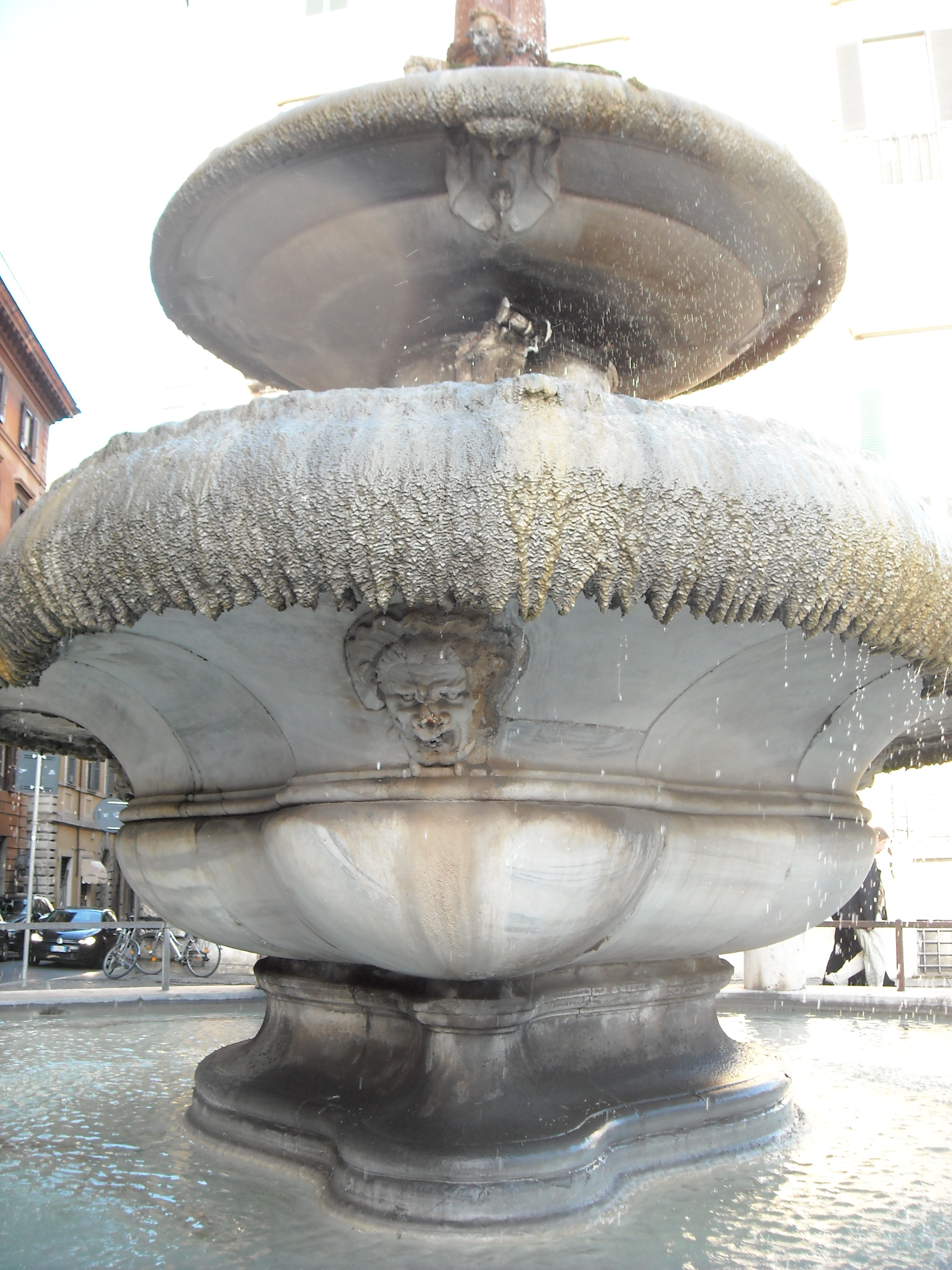
The pool with the mascarons

In 1587 the restoration and reinstatement of the ancient Aqua Alexandrina - from then on called Acqua Felice after the name of Pope Sixtus V, born Felice Peretti, the ruling pontiff - were completed. As previously done for the Aqua Virgo, works were started to create a secondary subterranean branch of the channel, in order to assure water provision in the areas of Viminal Hill and Quirinal Hill, then scarcely served, and in the area of the Tiber Island; consequently, the building of a certain number of fountains was also planned.

Pope Sixtus V commissioned the fountain to Giacomo Della Porta, who designed it in 1589, while the construction was carried out by Andrea Brasca, Pietro Gucci and Pace Naldini: it was a circular basin with two opposed bulges, giving it a vague oval shape, decorated with mascarons and lying on three steps with the same shape (the inner of which is smaller than the basin), surrounded by a narrow pool for the collection of water. In the middle of the basin a cubic marble block, with mascarons and adornments, sustained a goblet-shaped canister, on the top of which there was a basin containing four putti pouring water from as many amphoras. The fountain shares features, such as mascarons and simple basins with another of Della Porta's fountains: the Fontana del Pianto.

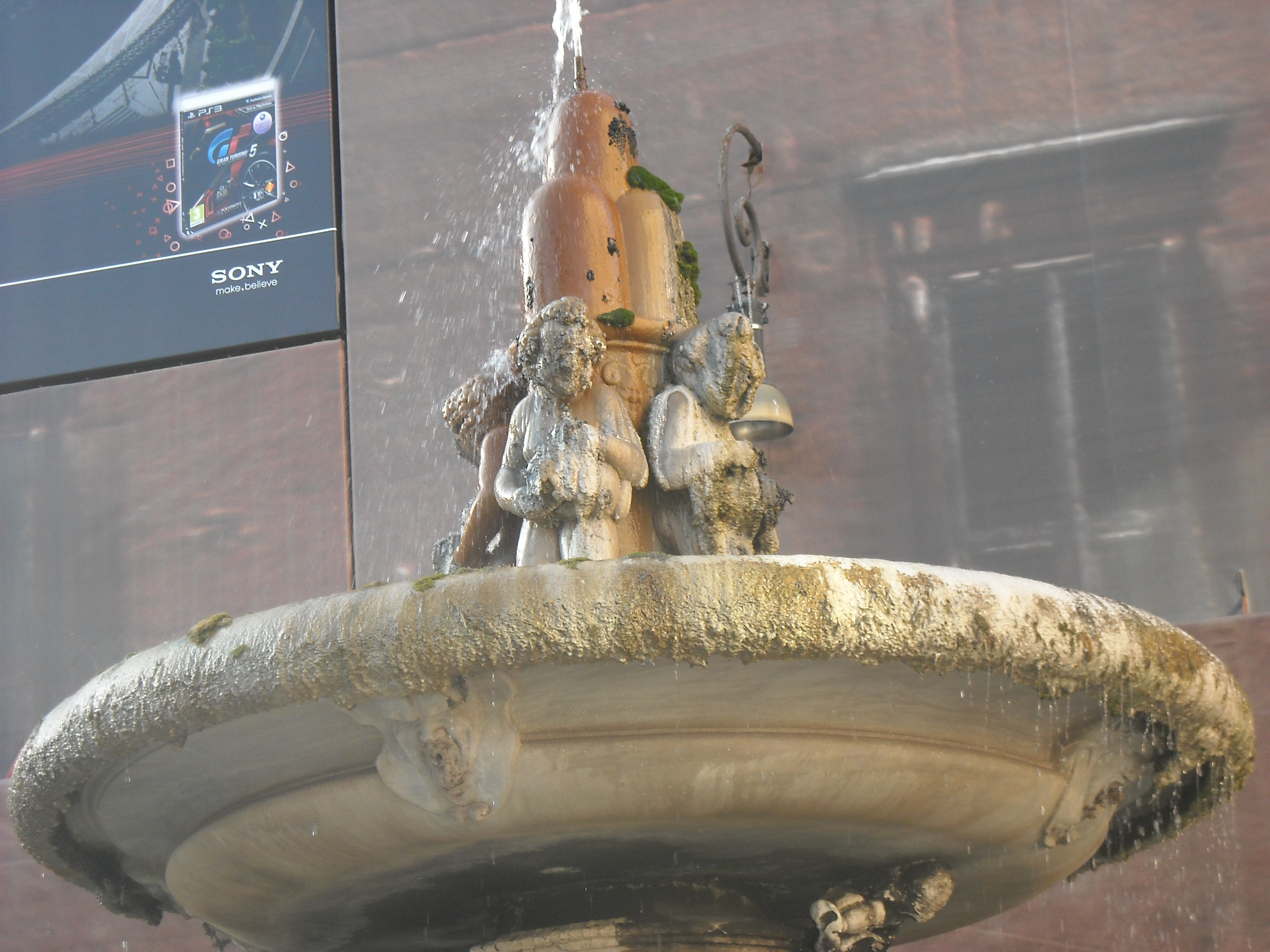
Fontana di piazza dell'Aracoeli - particolare

The banister of the fountain, formerly decorated with the coats of arms of the Roman People, was later adorned also with the coat of arm of the Chigi family, to which Pope Alexander VII (1655-1667) belonged: he furthermore added the trimontium, the heraldic symbol of the family, between the putti.

At the beginning of the 18th century, under the papacy of Clement XI, the two lower steps were removed and replaced by a big pool for the collection of the water, surrounded by a series of small stone columns linked by iron bars, probably under a design of Giambattista Contini. This is the present configuration of the fountain.

== Bibliography ==
- Sergio Delli, “Le fontane di Roma”, Schwartz & Meyer Ed., Rome, 1985

Preceded by Fontana del Pianto	Landmarks of Rome; Fontana di Piazza d'Aracoeli	Succeeded by Fontana di Piazza Colonna
