= Giovanni Lugari =

His Eminence Giovanni Battista Lugari
- Cardinal-Deacon of Santa Maria in Portico
- Church: Roman Catholic Church
- Appointed: 30 November 1911
- Term ended: 31 July 1914
- Predecessor: Francesco Segna
- Successor: Francis Aidan Gasquet
- Previous post: Assessor of the Congregation of the Holy Office (1902-11)

Orders
- Ordination: 15 January 1896
- Created cardinal: 27 November 1911 by Pope Pius X
- Rank: Cardinal-Deacon

Personal details
- Born: Giovanni Battista Lugari; 18 February 1846 Rome, Papal States
- Died: 31 July 1914 (aged 68) Rome, Kingdom of Italy
- Buried: Campo Verano
- Education: Pontifical Gregorian University

Styles of Giovanni Lugari
- Reference style: His Eminence
- Spoken style: Your Eminence
- Informal style: Cardinal
- See: none

Giovanni Battista Lugari (18 February 1846—31 July 1914) was an Italian Cardinal of the Roman Catholic Church who from the time he became a priest at nearly fifty years of age, worked in the Roman Curia.

== Early life and ==
Giovanni Lugari was born in Rome, and there studied at the Royal University and Pontifical Gregorian University. He was ordained to the priesthood on 15 January 1896, when nearly fifty years old.

== Career ==
He then entered the service of the Roman Curia, being named Assessor and Sub-Promoter of the Faith of the Sacred Congregation of Rites on the following 3 February. After being appointed Privy Chamberlain supernumerario three days later, on 6 February, Lugari was made full Promotor of the Faith on 4 June 1897. On 4 June 1897 he became a Domestic Prelate of His Holiness.

In 1900, he was made a canon of the Liberian Basilica on 28 March, and of the Lateran Basilica on 10 June. Lugari was named Papal Auditor on 22 April 1901 and served as the Promotor of the Faith in the canonization process of Joan of Arc during that same year. He became Assessor of the Supreme Sacred Congregation of the Holy Office on 11 January 1902, and a canon of St. Peter's Basilica on the following 1 February.

Lugari was made a protonotary apostolic supernumerarium on 2 February 1902, and later consultor of the Sacred Congregation of Rites on 18 April that same year. His long years of work in the Curia were recognized by Pope Pius X, who created him Cardinal Deacon of S. Maria in Portico in the consistory of 27 November 1911.

== Death ==
The Cardinal died in his native Rome, at age 68. He is buried in the Campo Verano cemetery.
