= Francesco Ricci Paracciani =

Italian priest

His Eminence Francesco Ricci Paracciani
- Archpriest of Saint Peter's Basilica
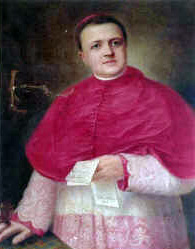
- Church: Roman Catholic Church
- Appointed: 6 October 1892
- Term ended: 9 March 1894
- Predecessor: Edward Henry Howard
- Successor: Mariano Rampolla del Tindaro
- Other posts: Cardinal-Priest of San Pancrazio (1891-94); President of the Congregation of the Reverend Basilica of Saint Peter (1892-94)
- Previous post: Cardinal-Deacon of Santa Maria in Portico (1882-91)

Orders
- Created cardinal: 13 December 1880 ("in pectore"); 27 March 1882 (revealed) by Pope Leo XIII
- Rank: Cardinal-Deacon (1882-91); Cardinal-Priest (1891-94)

Personal details
- Born: Francesco Ricci Paracciani; 8 June 1830 Rome, Papal States
- Died: 9 March 1894 (aged 63) Rome, Kingdom of Italy
- Buried: Campo Verano
- Parents: Pietro Ricci Paracciani; Elisabetta Cavalletti
- Coat of arms: Francesco Ricci Paracciani's coat of arms

Francesco Ricci Paracciani (8 June 1830 – 9 March 1894) was an Italian priest of the Catholic Church, who spent his career in the service of the papal household and in the Roman Curia.

== Biography ==
Francesco Ricci Paracciani was born in Rome on 8 June 1830 into a family of the Tuscan nobility. His relatives included Cardinals Urbano Paracciani (1715-1777), his great-grandfather, Niccola Paracciani Clarelli (1799–1872), his second cousin, and Salvatore Nobili Vitelleschi (1818–1875), his cousin. Throughout his Vatican career, he spent several months of the year at his family's property in Montepulciano.

He entered the papal service shortly after being ordained a priest, following a career path suited a member of the nobility. He joined the papal household as a privy chamberlain and held positions of increasing administrative responsibility and ceremonial distinction, including canon of the chapter of St. Peter's Basilica. He became master of papal audiences on 24 March 1868 and prefect of the Pontifical Household on 1 October 1875.

The cardinals at the 1878 papal conclave gave him responsibility for the administrative affairs of the conclave by electing him as its governor.

Pope Leo XIII made him a cardinal on 13 December 1880, reserving his name in pectore and announcing his elevation publicly on 27 March 1882. He received his red galero and was assigned the deaconry of Santa Maria in Portico on 30 March 1882.

He became Grand Prior of the Sovereign Order of Jerusalem on 4 March 1885. He opted for the order of cardinal priests and was given the title of San Pancrazio on 1 June 1891. He was named secretary of memorandums on 26 January 1892.

He was appointed archpriest of St. Peter's Basilica on 6 October 1892 and, as is customary, was prefect of the Fabric of Saint Peter.

Throughout his career he promoted nights schools to provide training for artisans and workmen. He led the Commission for Evening Schools.

He died in Rome on 9 March 1894.

He was buried in the chapel at Verano of the Chapter of the Vatican Basilica.
