= Roman Catafalque for Philip IV of Spain =

17th-century Italian work

The Catafalque of Philip IV of Spain was a large temporary catafalque built on the death of Philip IV of Spain in 1665 in the nave of Santa Maria Maggiore, Rome, Italy.

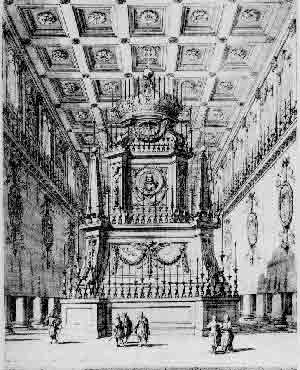
Rainaldi's print of the catafalque

Designed by architect Carlo Rainaldi and executed by many anonymous Roman artists and carpenters, the catafalque was an immense painted wooden construction, nearly reaching the flat ceiling of the basilica. A portrait of Philip was attached to the front of the catafalque; on other sides there were other festoons mixed with skulls. An outsized crown topped the monument. Octagonal in shape, its four levels were covered in glowing candles. The windows of the basilica were covered and drapes hung from the nave's columns, with the intention of creating a rather eerie effect, although this is not immediately apparent from the accompanying engraving. However, a contemporary report notes that during the hours of darkness the whole church seemed like "a serene night time sky in which shone many bright stars."

However, Philip IV died in Spain, so unlike traditional catafalques, the monument housed no cadaver. This was a common occurrence in seventeenth-century Rome, where the deaths of various Catholic kings and queens were 'celebrated' with such temporary monuments.

Philip had died on 17 September 1665. The catafalque took a few months to create for it was not until 11 December of the same year that there was an official ceremony related to the catafalque's construction. A procession was held, ending at Santa Maria Maggiore, where a noted Jesuit, Ignazio Bompiani, gave an oration, accompanied by suitable music.

Santa Maria Maggiore was occasionally used as the site for events relating to the Spanish crown. Both Philip IV and his father, Philip III of Spain, had been benefactors to the church, hence the desire of the basilica’s clerics to sponsor such a monument.
