= Fontana del Nettuno, Piazza del Popolo =

Monumental fountain in the Piazza del Popolo in Rome

Fontana del Nettuno
- Fountain
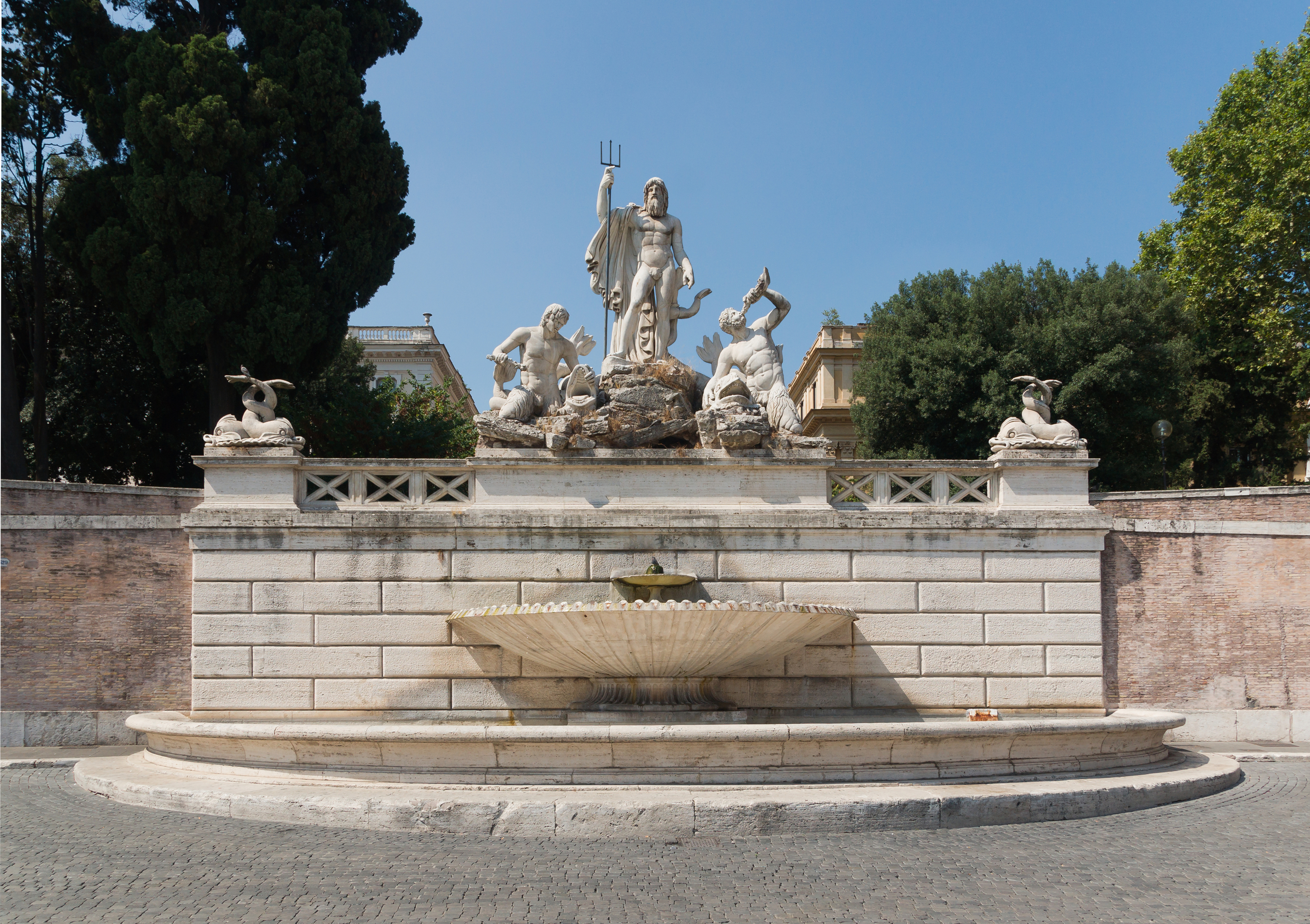
- Fontana del Nettuno, Piazza del Popolo
- Location: Piazza del Popolo, Rome
- Interactive map of Fontana del Nettuno
- Coordinates: 41°54′38″N 12°28′32″E

The Fontana del Nettuno (Fountain of Neptune) is a monumental fountain located in the Piazza del Popolo in Rome.

== History ==
It was constructed in 1822–23 at the terminus of a newly built aqueduct, the Acqua Vergine Nuovo.

== Design ==
The fountains in the Piazza del Popolo were the work of Giovanni Ceccarini. The Fontana del Nettuno is located on the west side of the square, and shows Neptune with his Trident, accompanied by two Tritons.

Preceded by Fountain of Neptune, Rome	Landmarks of Rome; Fontana del Nettuno, Piazza del Popolo	Succeeded by Fontana del Pantheon
