= Santa Maria del Pianto, Rome =

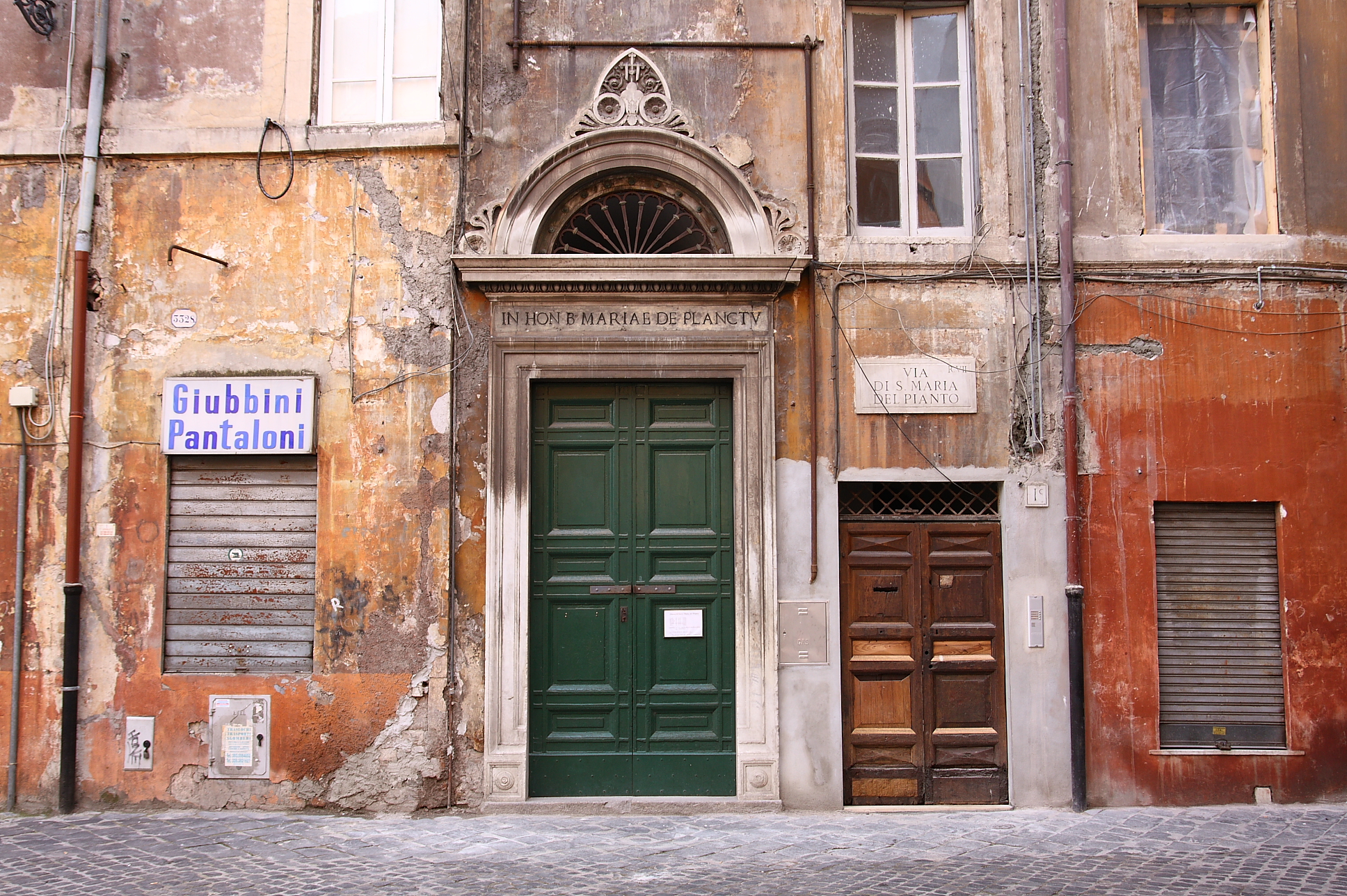
Inconspicuous entrance to the church at Via Santa Maria del Pianto.

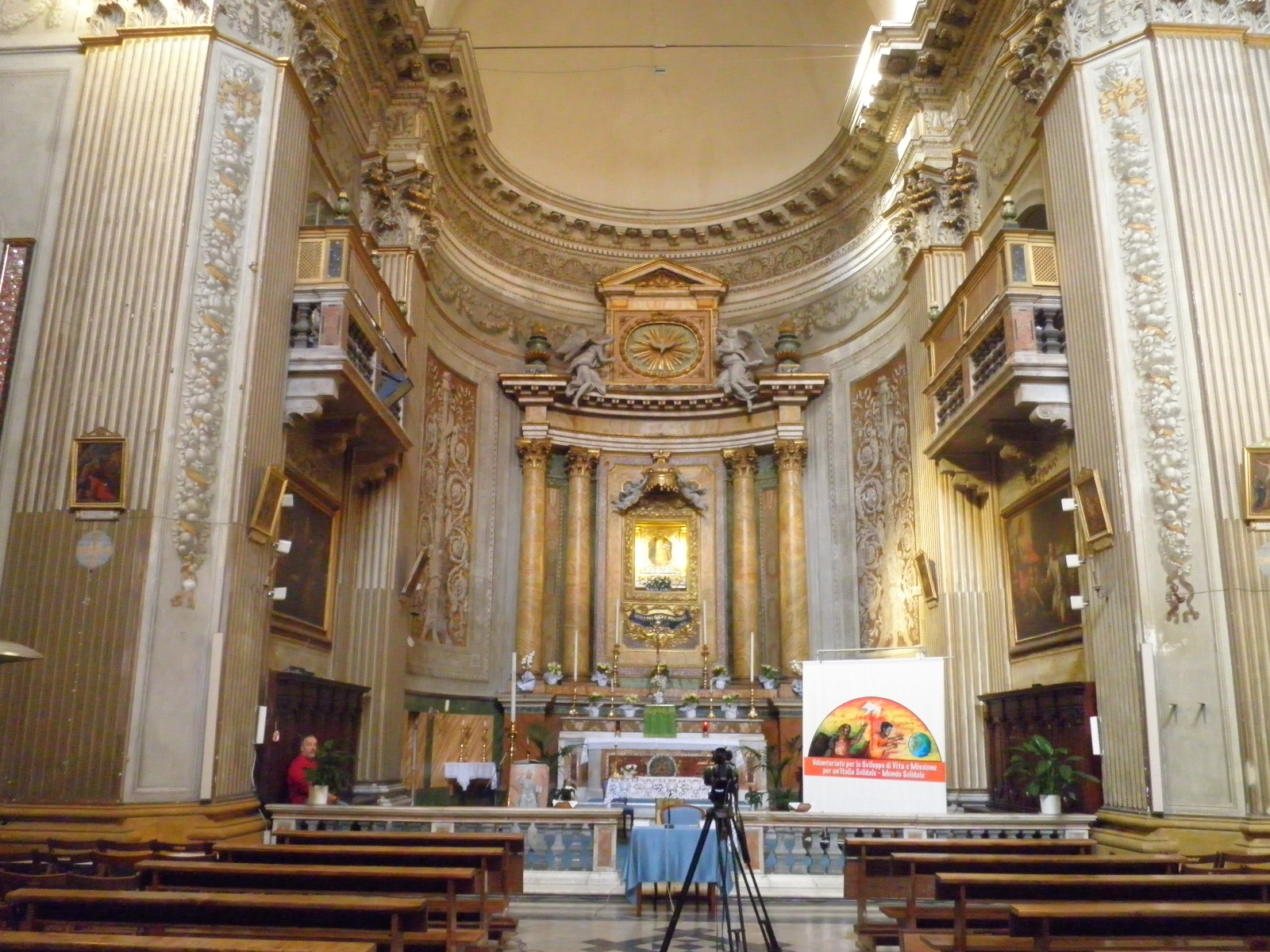
Interior of church towards apse

Santa Maria del Pianto is a Roman Catholic church in the Rione Regola, with entrances on the South at Piazza delle Cinque Scole/ Via di Santa Maria de' Calderari and on the north on Via di Santa Maria del Pianto. It is presently affiliated with Oblates of the Virgin Mary.

== History and description ==
The church was once called San Salvatore or Santa Maria de Cacaberis, and it was the church sponsored by the guild of boilerworkers and metalworkers. The word Cacabus means "metal basin" in Latin. The present name was taken from the street on which it lies. In 1546, a miracle was said to occur when an image of a virgin, painted above a door nearby, was said to have shed tears during a street crime, and supposedly spoke to the offender.

In 1608–1612, the present church, with its dome, was built by Nicolò Sebregondi, who failed to complete a façade, leaving the entrances only as a doors with labeled lintels. The church housed an archconfraternity and was involved in attempts to proselytize in the Roman Ghetto. The church had a processional standard banner painted by Lazzaro Baldi. The main altar still shelters the miraculous 15th century icon, flanked by alabaster columns. In the choir are two paintings by Agostino Ciampelli.
