= Santa Maria in Campitelli =

- Church of Saint Mary by the Porticus, in Campitelli
- Chiesa di Santa Maria in Portico in Campitelli
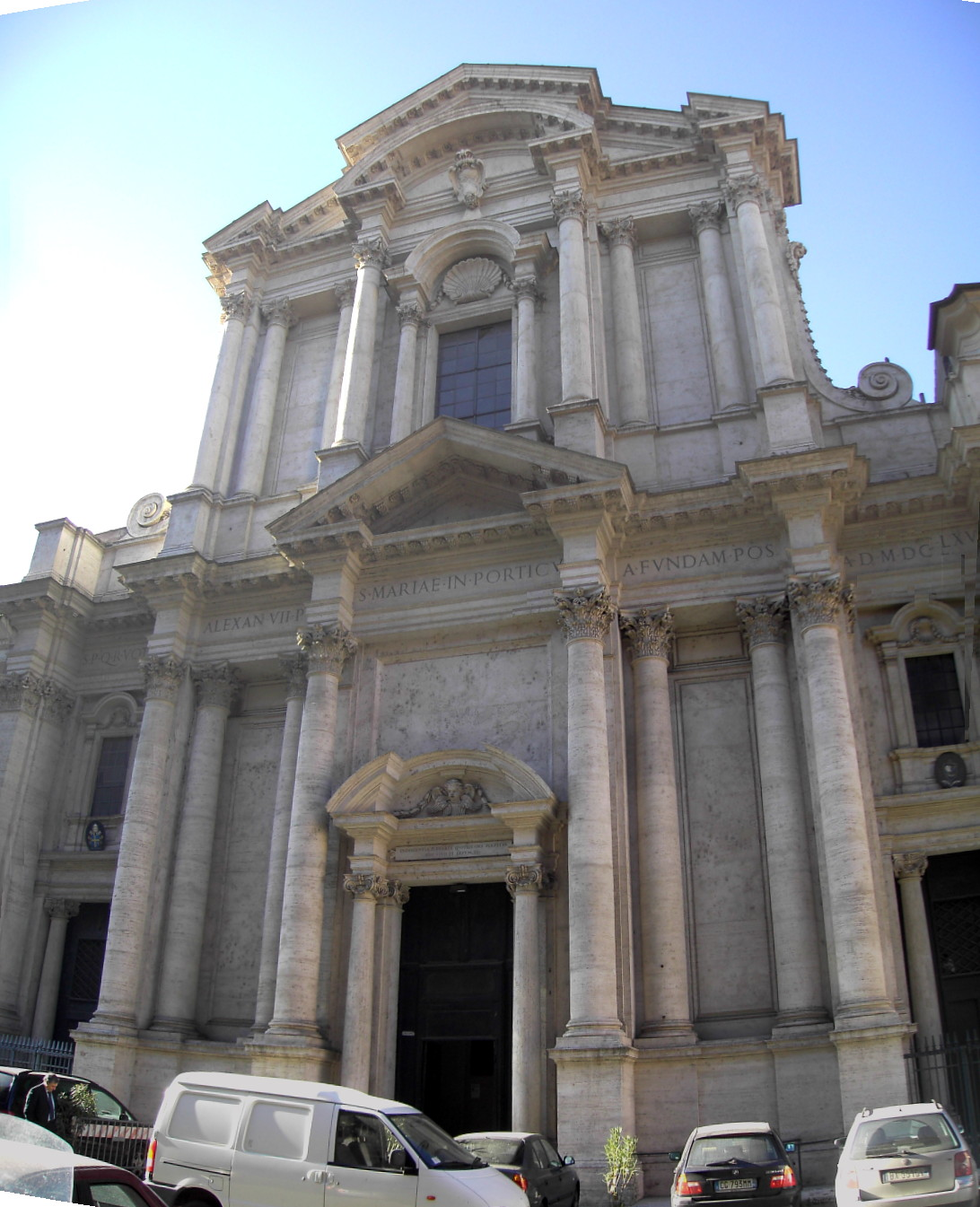
- Portico
- Click on the map for a fullscreen view
- 41°53′35″N 12°28′46″E
- Location: Piazza di Campitelli 9, Rome
- Country: Italy
- Language: Italian
- Denomination: Catholic
- Tradition: Roman Rite
- Religious institute: Clerics Regular of the Mother of God
- Website: santamariainportico.it

History
- Status: titular church
- Founded: 6th century AD
- Dedication: Mary, mother of Jesus

Architecture
- Architectural type: Baroque
- Completed: 1667

Administration
- Diocese: Rome

Santa Maria in Campitelli or Santa Maria in Portico (Santa Maria in Portico di Campitelli) is a church dedicated to the Virgin Mary on the narrow Piazza di Campitelli in Rione Sant'Angelo, Rome, Italy. The church is served by the Clerics Regular of the Mother of God.

== History ==
Santa Maria in Campitelli is located over the former site of the Temple of Jupiter Stator, part of the Porticus Octaviae until the area's destruction in the Great Fire of Rome in the mid-1st century. The Temple of Juno Regina was located nearby.

Tradition holds that a primitive oratory or church was founded at the site during the years 523–526, under the papacy of Pope John I. This structure was located near the Porticus Octaviae (giving the church and icon its name of "Madonna of the Portico"). The structure was created to house a venerated 25 cm-high icon of the Virgin Mary and Saints Peter and Paul. According to legend, the icon appeared miraculously in 524 at the table of Galla, a Roman woman who was helping the poor, and it was said to be carried in processions since 590.

The initial church structure was the no longer extant Oratory of Santa Galla, located across the piazza from the present church, and which was attached to a hospital of the same name. More recent analysis of the style and dendrochronology of the icon date it to the 11th century. The image is very likely a reproduction of some ancient painting or mosaic venerated in the Galla portico.

Circa 1656, the city of Rome was ravaged by plague, and it was felt that the prayers to this icon, which had been carried in procession through the streets, had played a role in stopping the epidemic. This putative miraculous intervention prompted Pope Alexander VII to erect a grander church, instead of the ancient oratory, to house the icon. He commissioned the high Baroque design from Carlo Rainaldi, and construction took place between 1659 and 1667. The church was kept under the maintenance by the order of Clerics Regular of the Mother of God, that had been founded in Lucca.

Rainaldi's facade has a complex stacking of two levels of travertine Corinthian (below) and composite columns, detached from the facade, and emphasizing a strong vertical lines. The original design included statues which were however never executed. The portal has an inscription offering plenary indulgence daily to the living and dead.

Santa Maria in Portico is a diaconate; it has as its current Cardinal-Deacon Michael Louis Fitzgerald.

To the left of the facade is a fountain by Giacomo della Porta. The Church was a location for the 2021 movie House of Gucci for the scene of the wedding of Patrizia (Lady Gaga) and Maurizio (Adam Driver).

== Interior ==
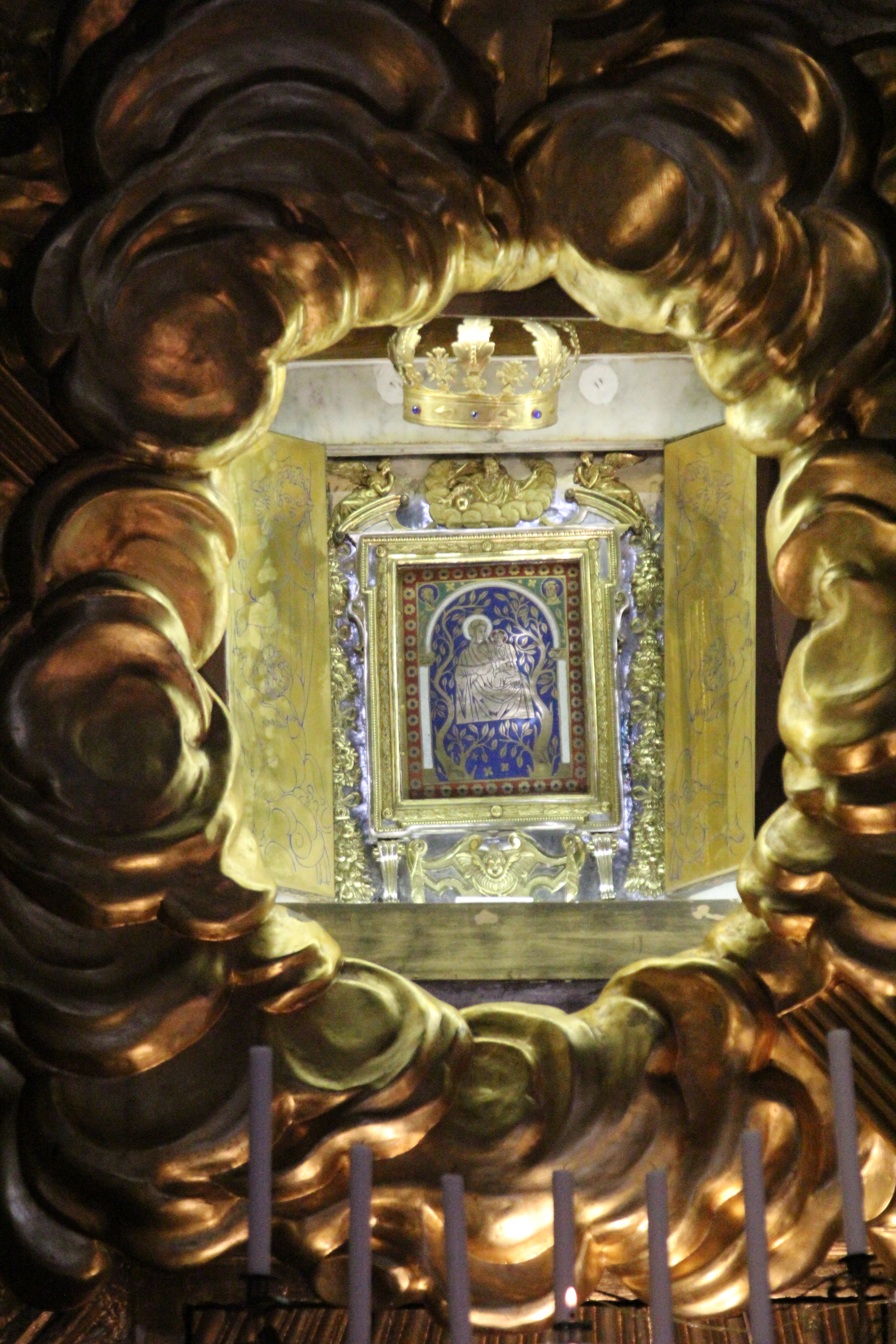
Santa Maria in Portico

The main altar of the church houses the icon in a gilded glory or gloria of angels, clouds and rays of light, recalls the effects used by Bernini for the apse of Basilica of St Peter. The design was an invention of Melchiorre Cafà who made a wax model (but his participation in the project was cut short by his untimely death) the project was directed by Rainaldi (c.1666), it was completed by Giovanni Antonio de Rossi, Ercole Ferrata and Giovanni Paolo Schor. The main altar enshrines the small icon of Santa Maria in Portico.

The icon is a precious work of silver-gilt and champlevé enamel, probably from the 11th century. There is a staircase behind the 'gloria' allowing a better view of the icon, open by request only.

In the right crossing is the funerary monument of Cardinal Bartolomeo Pacca (died 1863), sculpted by Ferdinando Pettrich.

== Chapels ==
- Chapel of St. Michael the Archangel: The first chapel on the right has an altarpiece depicting St Michael Archangel by Sebastiano Conca.
- Chapel of St. Anne: The second chapel, designed by Rainaldi, has an altarpiece depicting Saints Anne, Joseph, and Mary by Luca Giordano. The angels are by Michel Maille, Francesco Cavallini, and Francesco Baratta.
- Capella Muta Busi: The third chapel on the right displays an ancient Roman alabaster column, previously part of the old oratory.
- Albertoni Chapel: In the first chapel on the left, was refurbished (1705) by commission of Prince Angelo Altieri, and designed by Sebastiano Cipriani. The bas-relief altarpiece depicts a Holy Family and Blessed Ludovica Albertoni by Lorenzo Ottoni. The site chosen for this church included the location of the house where Ludovica Albertoni had lived. In 1669 Gaspare Paluzzi Albertoni had married Laura Caterina Altieri, niece of Pope Clement X. This Pope, whose family name would have otherwise died, had this Albertoni change their surnames to Altieri. Flanking the Baroque Ottoni relief are two neoclassical funerary monuments of Altieri family members.
- Albertoni Altieri Chapel: The second chapel on the left was commissioned by Cardinal Paluzzo Paluzzi Altieri degli Albertoni, and designed by Giovanni Battista Contini. The angels in the cardinal's funerary monument here were sculpted by Giuseppe Mazzuoli. The main altarpiece was painted by Il Baciccia, while the ceiling frescoes were painted by Giacinto Calandrucci. The remains of San Giovanni Leonardi, founder of the Clerics Regular, is enshrined under the altar.
- Capizucchi Chapel: In the third chapel to the left is an altarpiece depicting the Conversion of St Paul by Ludovico Gimignani. The ceiling was frescoed by Ricciolini. This chapel was commissioned by a member of the Capizucchi family, and designed by Mattia de Rossi.

Since the time of the James Francis Edward Stuart, the church has been a center of devotion praying for the conversion of England back to Catholicism.

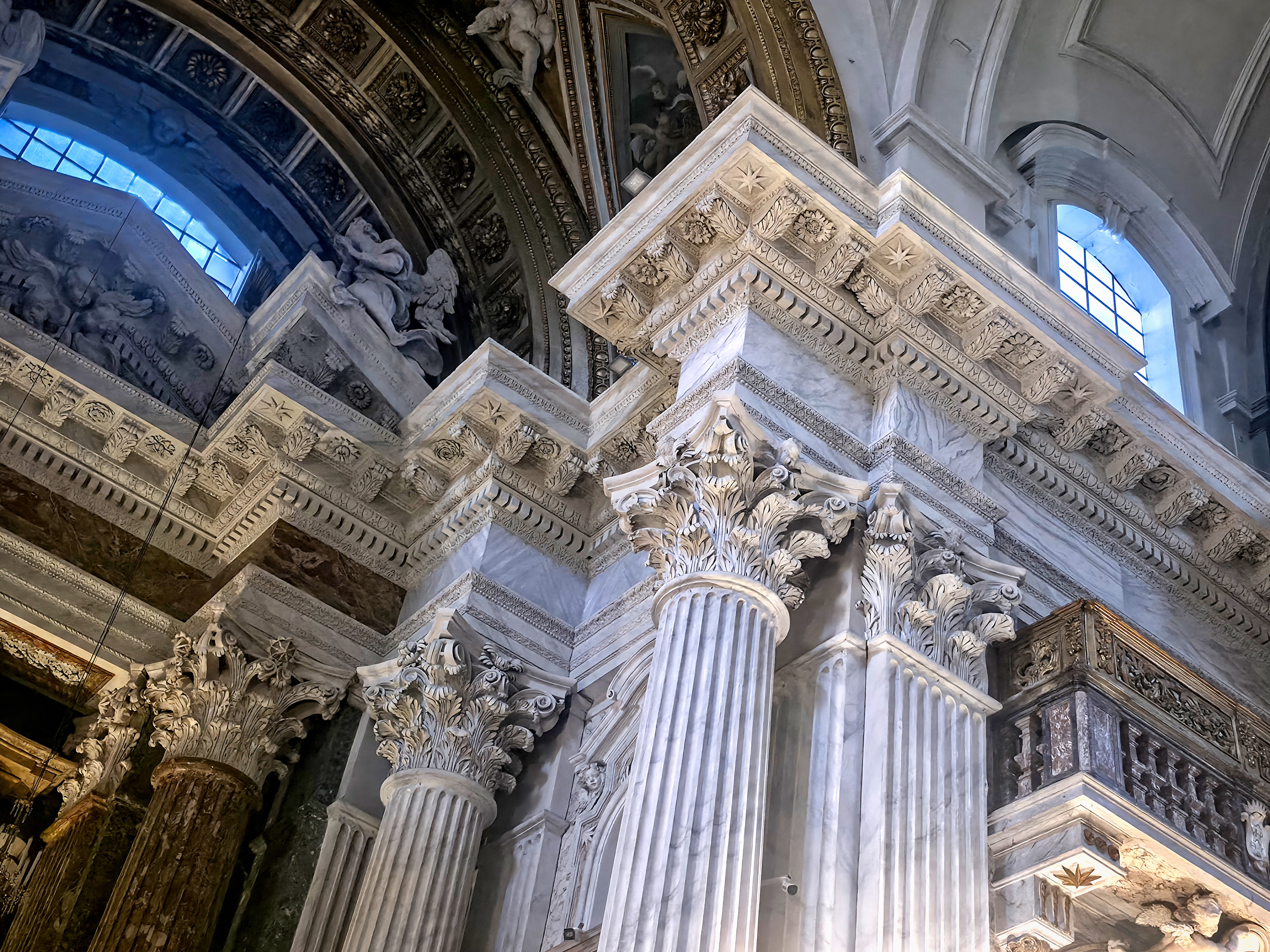
Rainaldi's complex ressauts

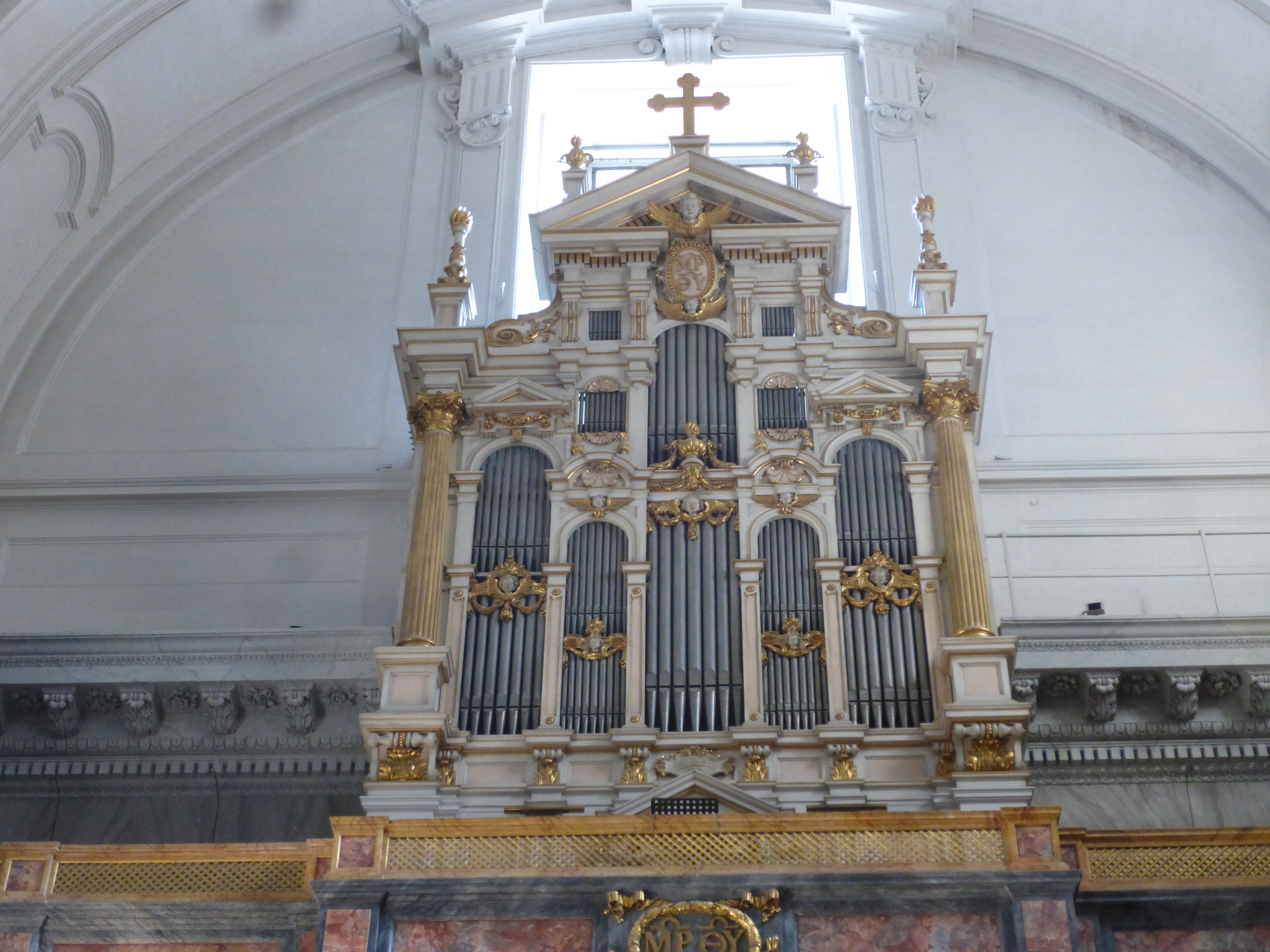
pipe organ

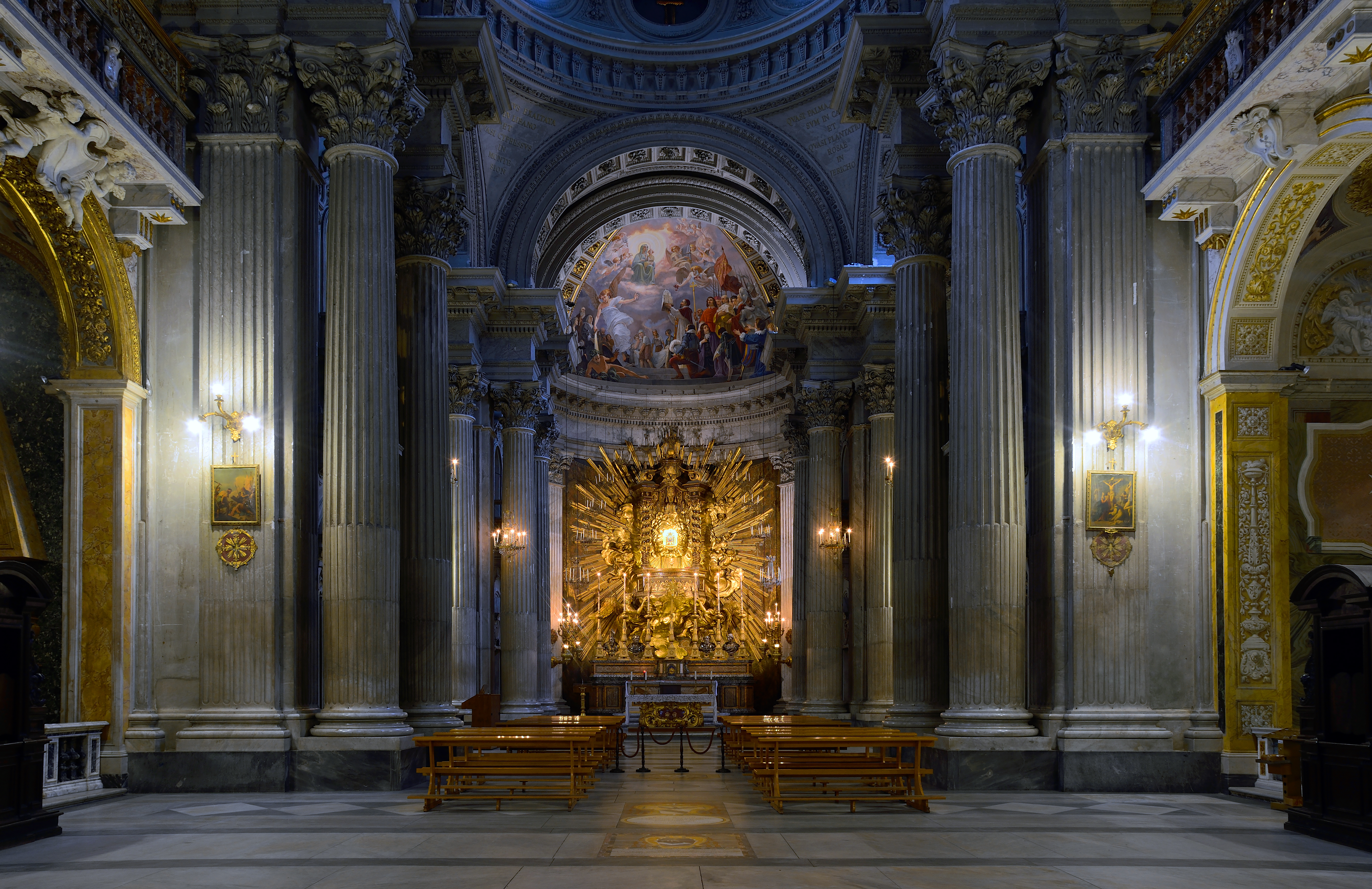
View towards main altar and gilded glory

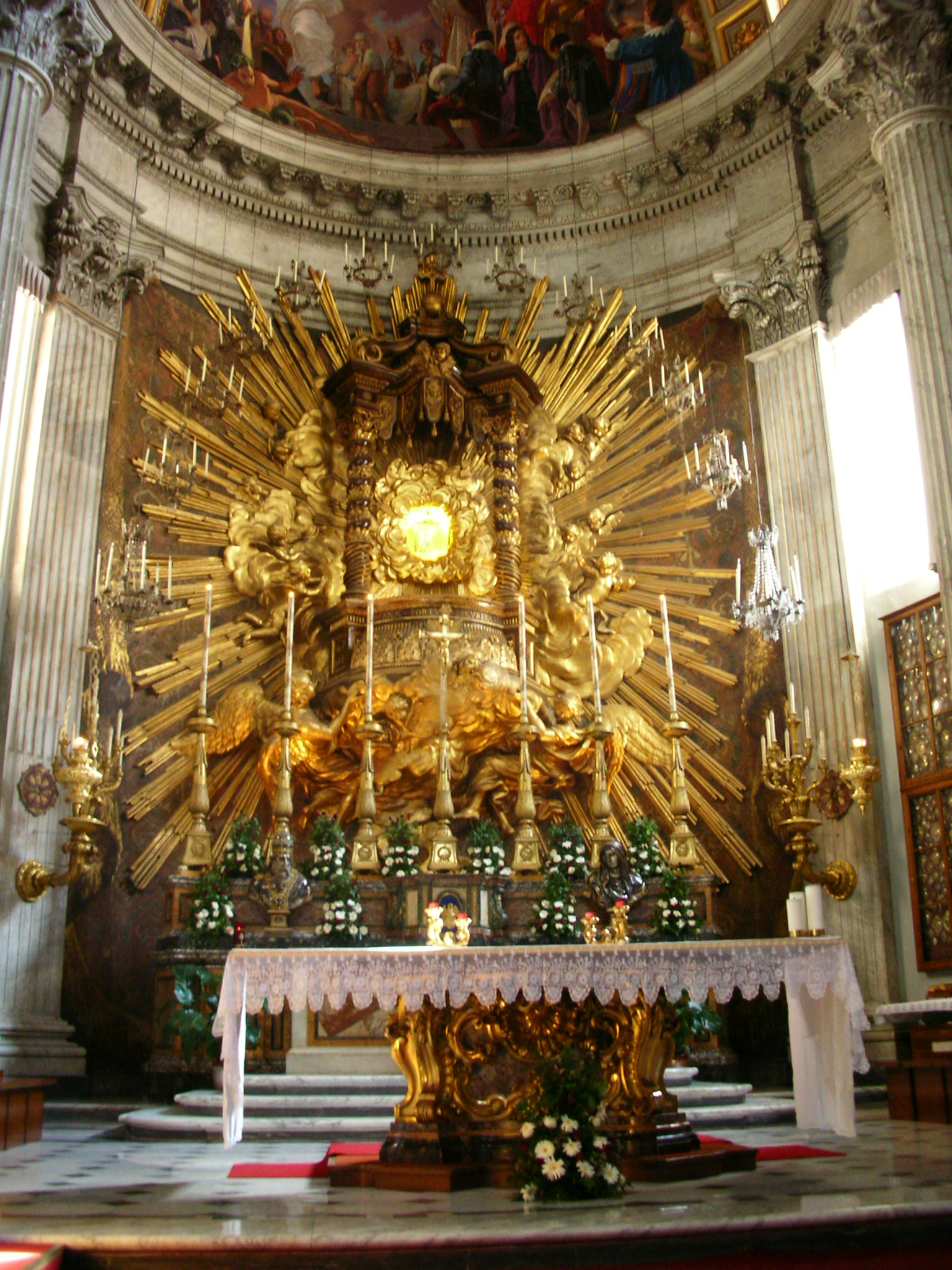
SantaMariaCampitelli-Altar

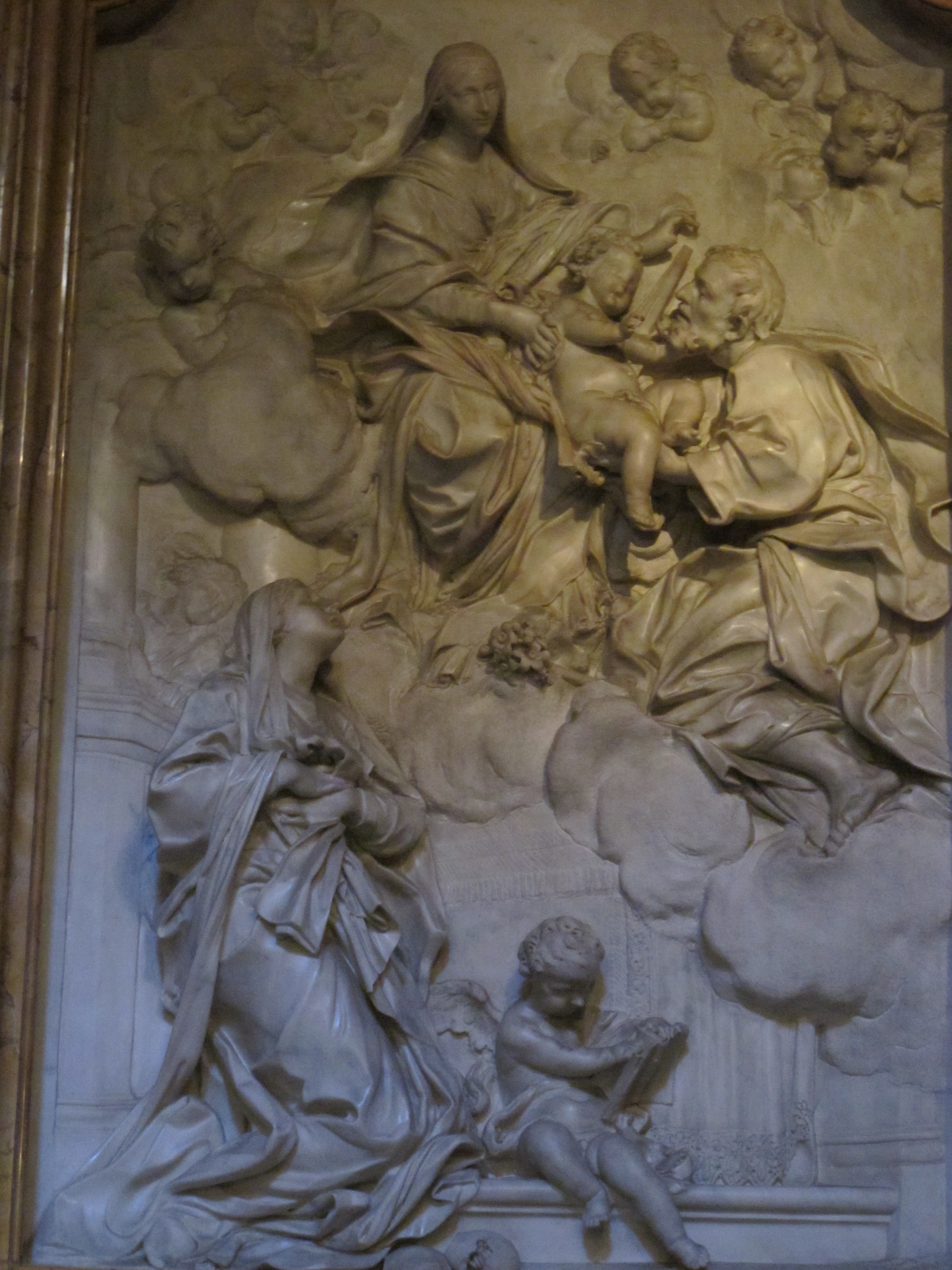
Marble bas-relief depicting the Holy Family and Blessed Ludovica Albertoni by Ottoni.

== List of cardinal deacons ==
- Ippolito de' Rossi (1586–1587)
- Vincenzo Costaguti (1643–1652)
- Francesco Maidalchini (1662–1666)
- Louis, Duke of Vendôme (1667–1669)
- Gaspare Carpegna (1671)
- Felice Rospigliosi (1673–1673)
- Girolamo Casanate (1673–1675)
- Benedetto Pamphilj (1681–1685)
- Luigi Omodei (1690–1706)
- Melchior de Polignac (1724)
- Carlo Collicola (1728–1730)
- Giacomo Lanfredini (1734–1741)
- Carlo Maria Sacripante (1741–1747)
- Henry Stuart (1747–1759)
- Flavio Chigi (1759–1771)
- Ignazio Boncompagni-Ludovisi (1775–1787)
- Filippo Carandini (1787–1794)
- Charles Erskine (1803–1811)
- Stanislao Sanseverino (1816–1825)
- Belisario Cristaldi (1828–1831)
- Adriano Fieschi (1838–1843)
- Lodovico Altieri (1845–1860)
- Francesco Pentini (1863–1869)
- Bartolomeo Pacca, Jr. (1875–1880)
- Francesco Ricci Paracciani (1882–1891)
- Francesco Segna (1894–1911)
- Giovanni Lugari (1911–1914)
- Francis Aidan Gasquet, OSB (1915–1924; Cardinal priest: 1924–1929)
- Massimo Massimi (1935–1946; Cardinal priest: 1946–1954)
- Carlo Chiarlo (Cardinal priest: 1958–1964)
- Charles Journet (1965–1973; Cardinal priest: 1973–1975)
- Corrado Bafile (1976–1987; Cardinal priest: 1987–2005)
- Andrea Cordero Lanza di Montezemolo (2006–2017)
- Michael L. Fitzgerald (2019–present)

== See also ==
- 17th-century Western domes
