= Giacomo della Porta =

Italian architect and sculptor (1533–1602)

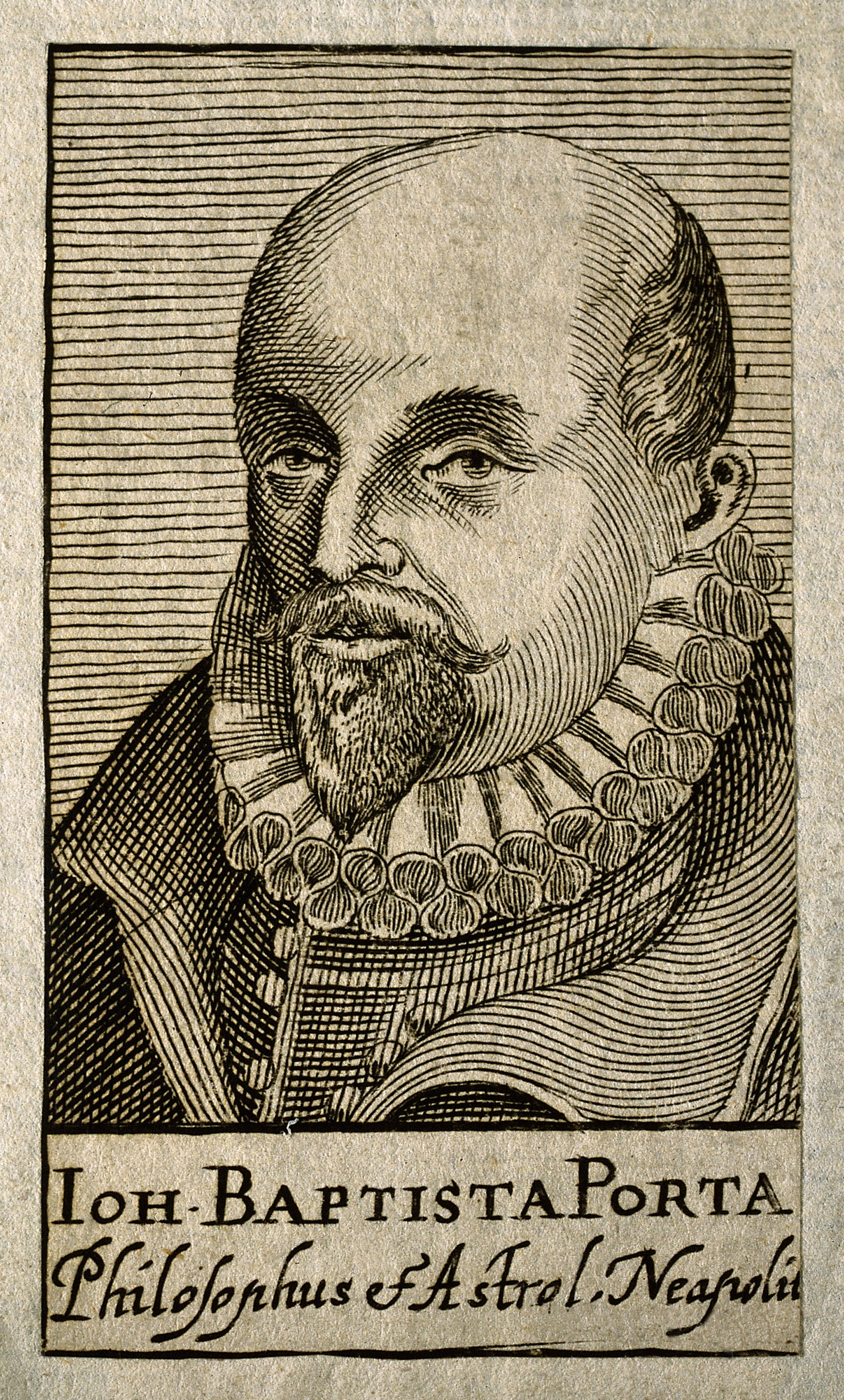
- Born: 1533; Genoa or Porlezza, Italy
- Died: 3 September 1602 (aged 68–69); Rome, Italy
- Occupations: Architect & Sculptor
- Known for: Façade of the Church of the Gesù

Giacomo della Porta (1533–1602) was an Italian architect and sculptor. Most likely born in Genoa or Porlezza, Italy, his work was inspired by famous Renaissance artists such as Michelangelo and Giacomo Barozzi da Vignola. He started in his career as a sculptor in his late 20s, and later transitioned into a more architectural focus. Della Porta's work on the Oratory of Santissimo Crocifisso marked the beginning of his architectural career in Rome. In 1564, he was elected as Architetto del Popolo Romano (Architect of the Roman People) and under this title he completed some of his most notable commissions, both public and private. Throughout his career, Della Porta had a tendency to carry out projects begun by other architects, or make particular additions to a project of another architect, as opposed to completing a project of his own from start to finish.

== Biography ==
=== Early life ===
Giacomo della Porta was born into a family of sculptors in 1533 in Genoa or Porlezza, Italy. In 1559, he began working in his uncle Bartolomeo's workshop as a sculptor. Among his earliest works in Genoa were statues of the aristocratic Cybo family, located in a chapel within Genoa Cathedral. Between 1560 and 1561, he completed his first architectural work, the portal of the Vigna Grimani on the Quirinale.

=== Influences ===
Giacomo studied as an architect apprentice under Guidetto Guidetti. His architectural style, rooted in functionality, drew influence from Michelangelo's Mannerism and Giacomo Barozzi da Vignola's Classicism. His first major project occurred between 1561 and 1568, where he worked as an architect alongside Guidetti on the Oratory of Santissimo Crocifisso in Rome. This work was the first to reveal how his style aligned with that of his mentors. Following the death of both Guidetti and Michelangelo in 1564, Della Porta carried out their projects, ensuring their legacies were not left unfinished. He finished Guidetti's work on the church of Santa Caterina de' Funari in Rome, and the Cesi Chapel in the Basilica of Santa Maria Maggiore in Rome. He also followed through with Michelangelo's plans to (re)build the Campidoglio, or Capitoline Hill, in addition to completing his work on Sforza Chapel in the Basilica of Santa Maria Maggiore.

== Early works (1561-1564) ==
=== Oratory of Santissimo Crocifisso ===
In June 1561, Giacomo della Porta came in contact with the Confraternity of the Most Holy Crucifix and put together a set of plans for the new oratory, which included a design of the façade. These plans were later received by the congregation at the confraternity meeting. Della Porta's designs for the façade demonstrated his tendency towards a more decorative style, inspired by Michelangelo. This style is particularly evident in the intricacies of the lower part of the façade that includes pediments (seen in the main portal, niches, and windows), triglyphs, garlands, and candelabra. Della Porta's work on the oratory also displays his tendency towards verticality, as well as the use of ornamental motifs of ribbon and garlands. These motifs can be found above the windows of the façade. His involvement in constructing the Oratory of Santissimo Crocifisso significantly shaped his career, elevating his reputation and thus securing future commissions.

=== The Church of Santa Caterina de' Funari ===
Della Porta's mentor, Guidetto Guidetti, was the primary architect for the Santa Caterina de' Funari starting in 1560, spanning to 1564. However, certain stylistic inconsistencies with the façade, which coincided with elements from Della Porta's earlier works, suggested his involvement. Specifically, there were various similarities between this façade and the façade of the Oratorio di San Marcello located in Rome, such as ornamentation with ribbons, garlands, cartouches, along with an inscription and coat of arms.

== Late works (1564-1601) as Architetto del Popolo Romano ==
In 1564, Della Porta was chosen as Architetto del Popolo Romano (Architect of the Roman People). Under this title, Giacomo della Porta oversaw many Capitoline works, both public and private.

=== Public commissions ===
==== Capitoline Hill ====
In 1564, Della Porta supervised the work on the Capitoline Hill. Even though Michelangelo's designs made up most of the complex, Della Porta oversaw many works within the Capitoline Hill. Many of these works included the facade of the Palazzo dei Conservatori in 1586, the inside layout of the Palazzo Senatorio and its facade, and the Cordonata. The large window in the Palazzo dei Conservatori, the windows and door surround of the Palazzo Senatorio, and the low wall of the Cordonata—whose slope he lowered to extend directly into the Piazza del Campidoglio—are also examples of Della Porta's intricate designs.

=== Private commissions ===
- He built the chapel dedicated to Faustina Rusticelli in the Basilica of San Giovanni in Laterano (Archbasilica of Saint John Lateran) between 1565 and 1571.
- He started building Carlo Muti a palazzo on the street, Via del Gesù in 1565, which was finished in 1582.
- He created an enclosed church and renovated the entire convent for the Dominican nuns of S. Sisto in Magnanapoli (Santi Domenico e Sisto), which was finished by 1575. He also made a dormitory for the convent of S. Ambrogio at the Massima (Sant'Ambrogio della Massima) in 1568.
- In 1589, Giacomo Della Porta, the last of 4 successive architects, completed the Palazzo Farnese, a lavish family residence for Pope Paul III (r. 1534–1549) once again completing the work of Michelangelo.
- In May 1601, Giacomo directed the rebuilding program of the Villa Aldobrandini, a villa commissioned by the Cardinal Pietro Aldobradini (r. 1604–1629) as his personal residence.
- Between 1597 and 1601, Della Porta renovated the transept in the Basilica of San Giovanni in Laterano (Archbasilica of Saint John Lateran).

==== Basilica of Santa Maria Maggorie ====
The project for the Basilica of Santa Maria Maggorie began in 1562, however, Della Porta's involvement happened near the end of the construction, roughly around 1573. He was likely the last architect to work on the Basilica. He reconstructed the transept and choir. Additionally, he worked on the Sforza Chapel, a chapel within the Basilica of Santa Maria Maggorie, and a former project of Michelangelo. He focused specifically on the interior decoration, the windows in the vault, and the facade.

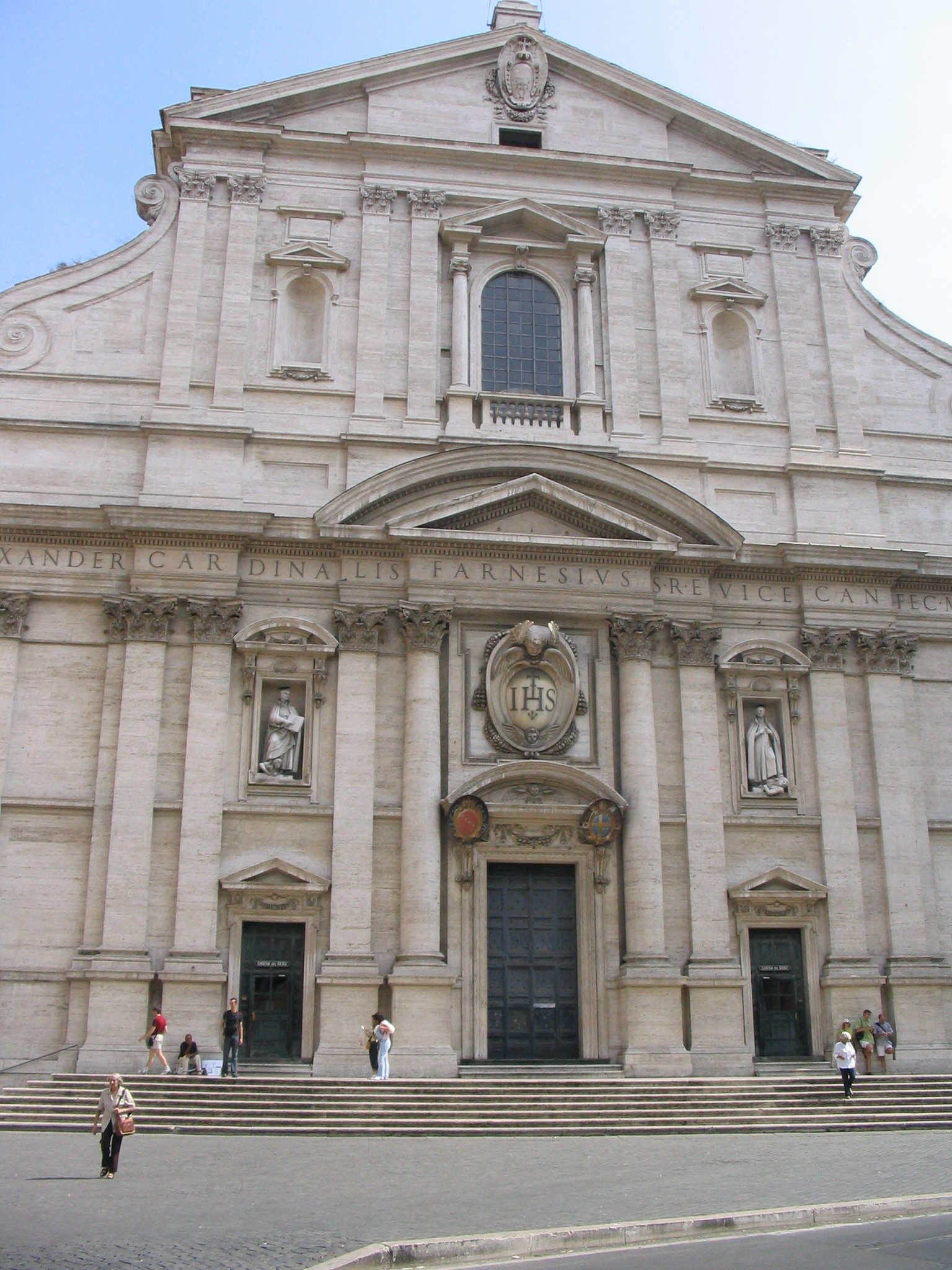
Façade of the church of Gesù in Rome.

==== Il Gesù ====
Giacomo Della Porta was one of the main architects of Il Gesù. His primary focus was on the façade. In 1571 Cardinal Alessandro Farnese (r. 1543–1589) chose Giacomo Della Porta's design over Jacapo Vignola's design for the façade of Il Gesù, and completed in 1573. Della Porta's design highlighted the façade's verticality and produced a powerful central climax, setting the stage for later Baroque façades. Additionally, Della Porta created the high altar in 1582 and Il Gesù's crossing in 1584.

==== St. Peter's Basilica ====
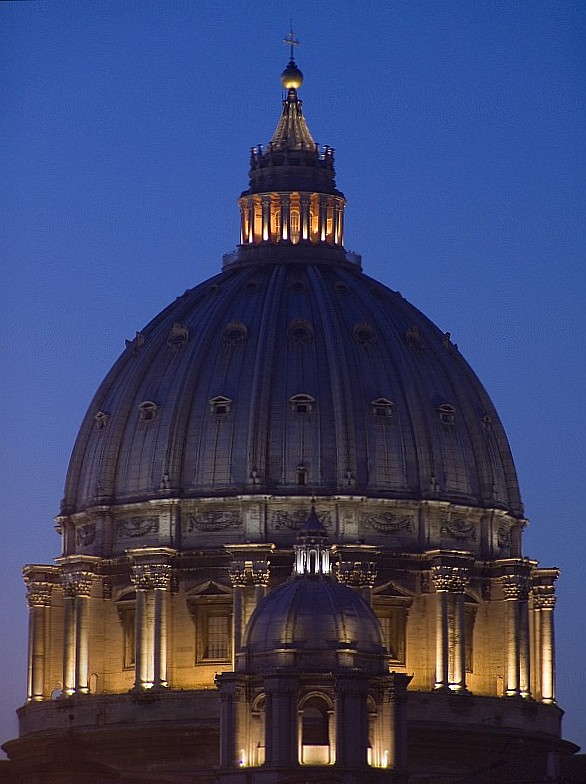
St. Peter's Dome

Giacomo della Porta became the architect of St. Peter's after Vignola's death in 1573. Della Porta began with overseeing the construction and the decoration of the Gregorian Chapel, which was completed in 1584. He then moved to work on the Clementine Chapel in 1578, which was completed in 1601. Additionally, a significant piece of Della Porta's work on St. Peter's Basilica was working on designs for the dome between 1588 and 1590. He helped with modifications and simplifications on the designs for the dome. In the end, Della Porta's focus was more on the walls, floor, and roof of St. Peter's.

===== Changes in the dome's design =====
Giacomo della Porta worked with Domenico Fontana on some projects. One such project was Michelangelo's dome, mentioned above. Della Porta and Fontana had the merit of the technical execution of a firm that sanctioned an important stage of technological advances at the end of the sixteenth century. They made a noticeable change in the bend curvature of Michelangelo's projected design, building the dome steeper, similar to the Brunelleschi model. Not only that, but they also inserted a series of chains in the masonry (especially in the upper part of the dome) to hold the transverse forces pushed by the vault, they used high-quality materials, hinging travertine plates with molten lead; features, which allowed the dome not to bear any serious damage after the earthquake of 1703.

Giacomo della Porta completed a number of Rome's fountains from the 16th century; these included the fountains in the Piazza del Popolo, the Fountain of Neptune, Rome and La Fontana del Moro in the Piazza Navona and Fontana delle Tartarughe very important for the Roman legends.

== Death ==
He died suddenly in 1602 coming back to Rome from Frascati, where he was working on the Villa Aldobrandini commissioned by the Aldobrandini family.

== Selected works ==
- Palazzetto Inside Palazzo Albertoni Spinola Perspective (1600)
- Oratorio del SS. Crocifisso (1562–1568)
- Fountains at the Palazzo Borghese (1573)
- Fountains in Piazza Colonna (1574)
- Small fountains at Piazza Navona (1574)
- One fountain at the Piazza della Rotonda
- Palazzo della Sapienza (1578–1602)
- Palazzo Capizucchi (1580)
- Santa Maria dei Monti (1580)
- Sant'Atanasio dei Greci (1581)
- Façade of San Luigi dei Francesi (1589)
- Fontana delle Tartarughe (1584)
- Santa Maria Scala Coeli
- Palazzo Marescotti (1585)
- Palazzo Serlupi (1585)
- SS. Trinità de' Monti (1586)
- Fontana di Piazza alli Monti (1589)
- Fountains at the Piazza di Santa Maria in Campitelli (1589)
- Fontana di Piazza d'Aracoeli (1589)
- Fontana della Terrina (1590)
- Sculpture Christ delivering the keys of Heaven to St. Peter (1594), altar of the St. Peter chapel, church Santa Pudenziana
- Palazzo Fani (1598)
- San Paolo alle Tre Fontane (1599)
- San Nicolò in Carcere (1599)
- Palazzo Albertoni Spinola (1600)
- Cappella Aldobrandini (1600–02) in Santa Maria sopra Minerva
