= Piazza del Campidoglio =

Square in Rome, Italy

- Public square
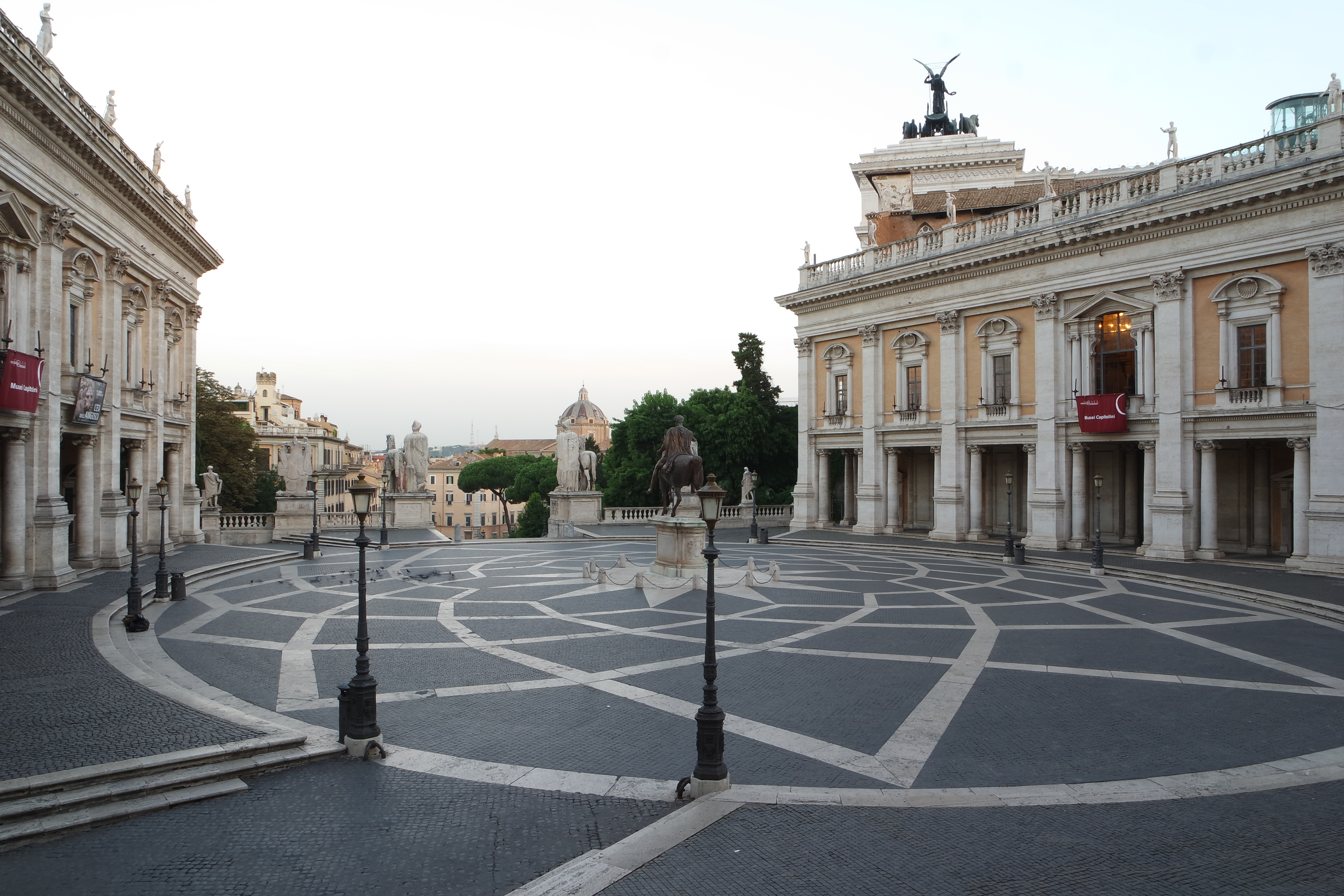
- Piazza del Campidoglio, on the top of Capitoline Hill, with the façade of Palazzo Senatorio
- Features: Palazzo Senatorio; Palazzo dei Conservatori; Capitoline Museums; Palazzo Nuovo
- Design: Michelangelo
- Completed: 16th century
- Architectural style: Ancient Roman architecture
- Owner: Metropolitan City of Rome
- Location: Rome, Italy
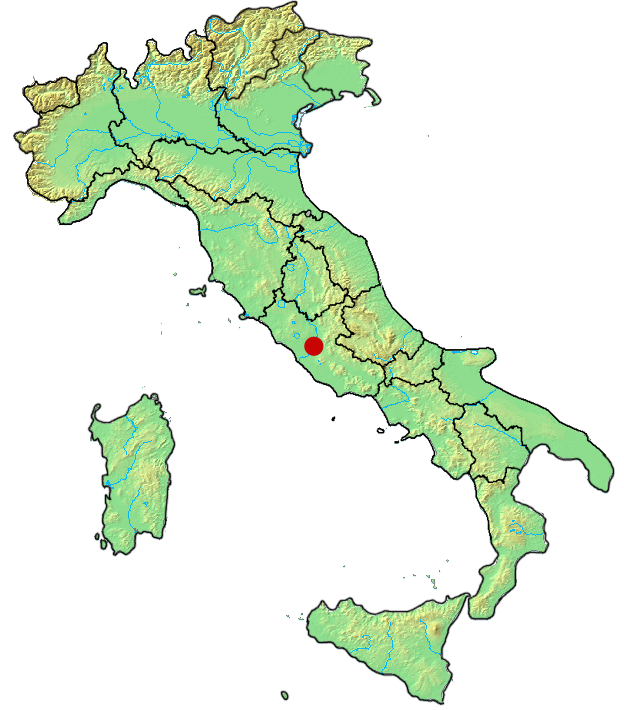
- Map of Italy
- Coordinates: 41°53′36″N 12°28′58″E

Piazza del Campidoglio ("Capitoline Square") is a public square (piazza) on the top of the ancient Capitoline Hill, between the Roman Forum and the Campus Martius in Rome, Italy. The square includes three main buildings, the Palazzo Senatorio (Senatorial Palace) also known as the Comune di Roma Capitale (City Hall), and the two palaces that make up the Capitoline Museums, the Palazzo dei Conservatori and the Palazzo Nuovo, considered to be one of the oldest national museums, founded in 1471 when Pope Sixtus IV donated some of the museum's most impressive statues, the She-wolf, the Boy with Thorn, the Camillus and the colossal head of emperor Constantine. Over the centuries the museums' collection has grown to include many of ancient Roman's finest artworks and artifacts. If something was considered too valuable or fragile in Rome and a copy was made in its place for display, the original is likely now on display in the Capitoline Museum. The hilltop square was designed by Michelangelo in the 16th century at the behest of Pope Paul III.

== History ==
Piazza del Campidoglio on the top of Capitoline Hill, took on its current layout in the 16th century, when Pope Paul III commissioned Michelangelo to complete a renovation for the visit of emperor Charles V of Habsburg to Rome. The project involved the makeover of the façades of the Palazzo Senatorio, built a few years earlier on the Roman ruins of the Tabularium (old records office of ancient Rome), and of the 15th-century Palazzo dei Conservatori. It included the construction of the Palazzo Nuovo and the addition of various sculptures and statues, including the Equestrian statue of Marcus Aurelius, placed in the center of the square.

Since the Middle Ages, the Piazza del Campidoglio has been the seat of the civil administration of the city. On the remains of the Tabularium stood a fortress of the Corsini family, which the Roman people took possession of in 1114. It was destined as the seat of the city senate and was enlarged in the 14th century. The dirt clearing in front, which accommodated the gatherings of the people, was flanked by buildings intended as the headquarters of the Banderesi (the captains of the city militia).

=== Michelangelo ===
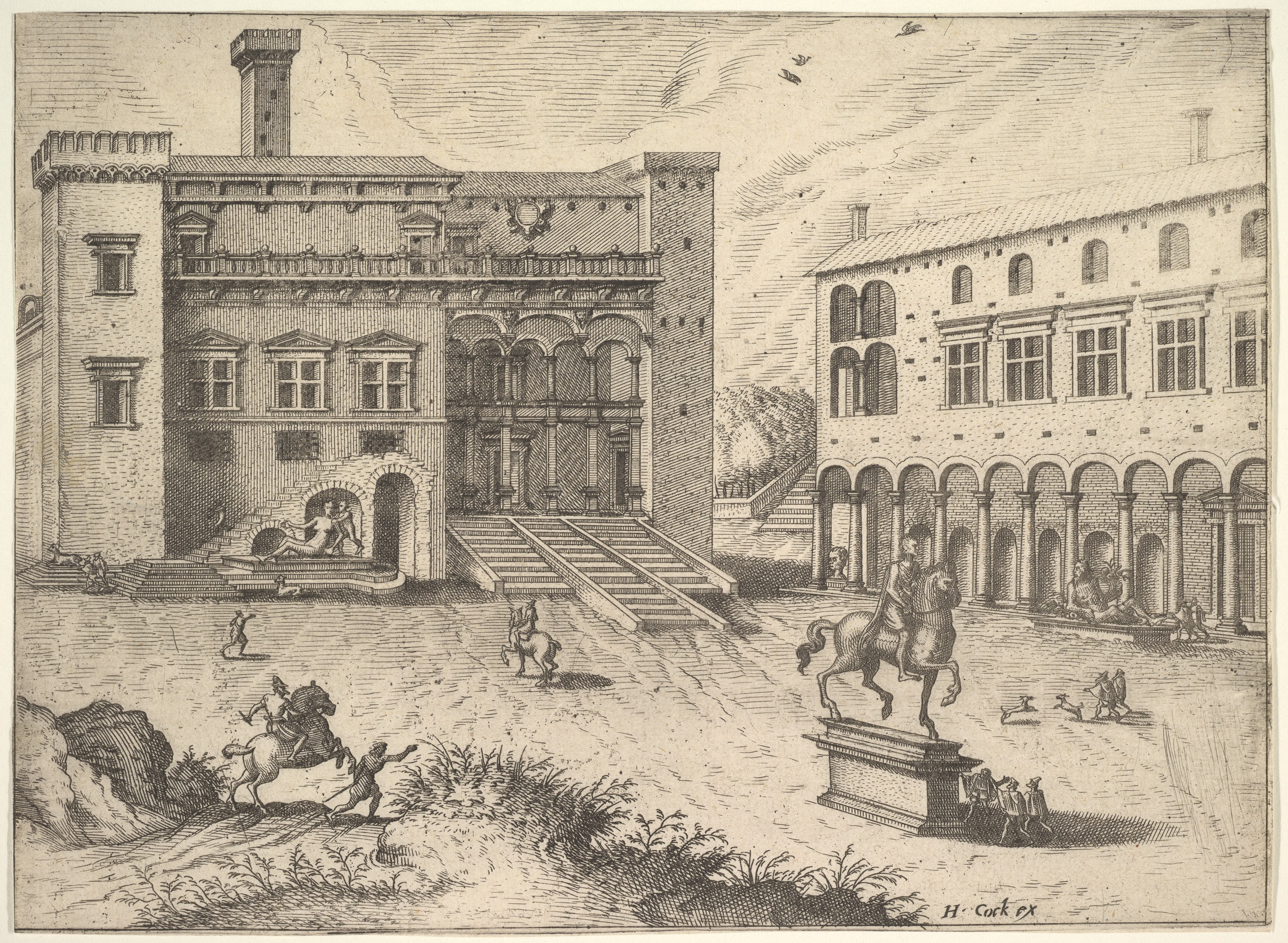
The Campidoglio area with Michelangelo's interventions that began in 1562

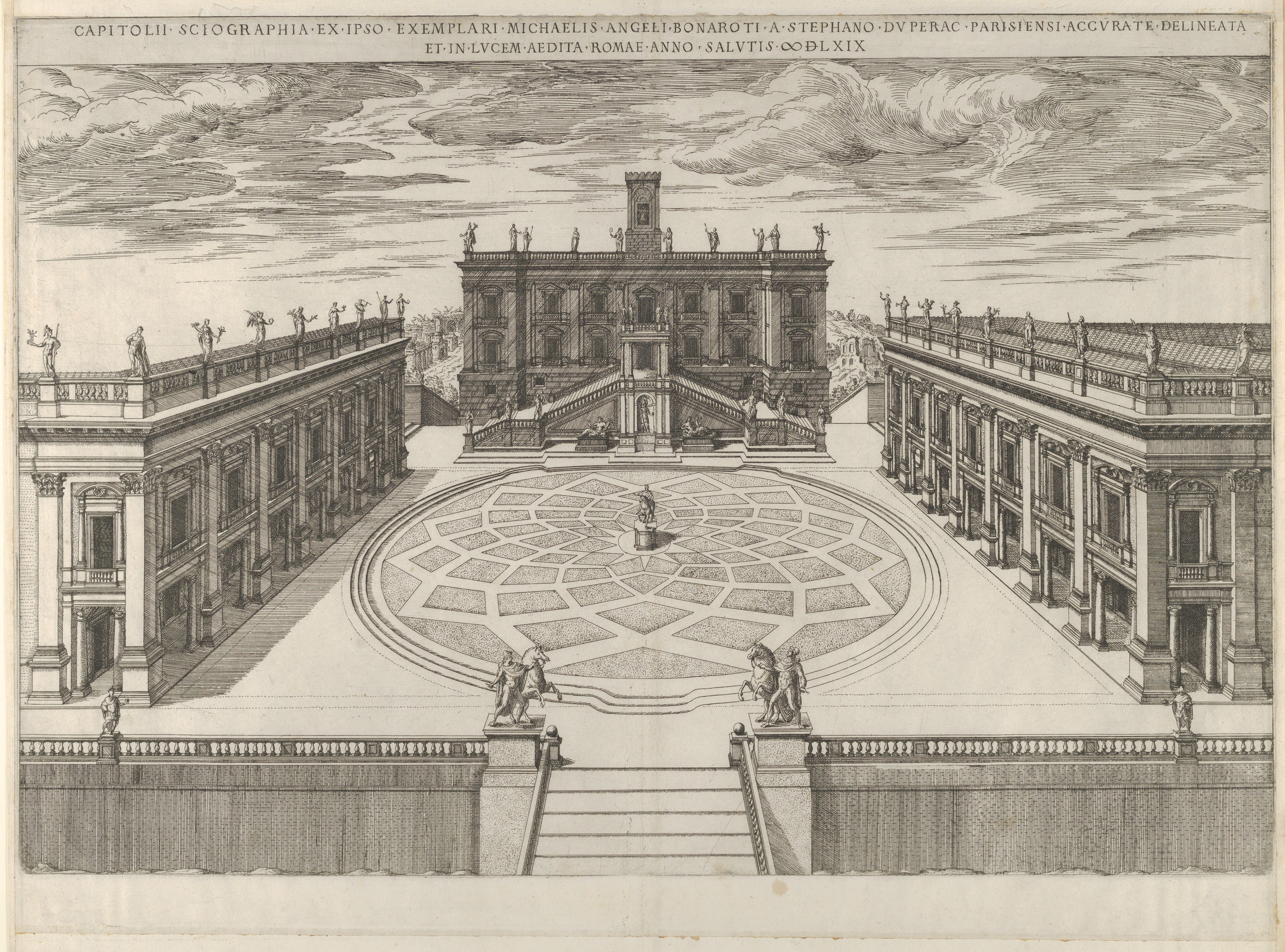
Michelangelo's redesign of the ancient Capitoline Hill included a complex spiralling pavement with a star at its centre.

Michelangelo di Lodovico Buonarroti (1475–1564), known as Michelangelo, was a Renaissance artist and architect. He was commissioned by Pope Paul III to rebuild the Piazza del Campidoglio because the pope wanted a symbol of the new Rome to impress Charles V, who was expected to visit Rome in 1538. Since the Middle Ages the piazza was in such a state of abandonment to be also called "colle caprino" (goat hill), as it was used for grazing goats after the triumphal journey organized in Rome in honor of Charles V in 1536.

The existing design of the Piazza del Campidoglio and the surrounding palaces was created by Michelangelo. At the height of his fame, Michelangelo was offered the opportunity to build a monumental civic plaza for a major city as well as to reestablish the grandeur of Rome.

Michelangelo's first designs for remodeling the square date to 1534. From 1534 to 1538 Michelangelo completely redesigned the square, drawing every detail and making the Capitoline no longer turn towards the Roman Forum but towards the St. Peter's Basilica, which represented the new political center of the city. In 1546, Michelangelo produced the oval design for the piazza that included complex spiraling pavement with a twelve-pointed star at its centre.

Michelangelo provided fronts to the official buildings of Rome's civic government, the Palazzo dei Conservatori, Palazzo Senatorio, and Palazzo Nuovo. Michelangelo designed a new façade for the dilapidated Palazzo dei Conservatori and he designed the Palazzo Nuovo to be a mirror complement, thereby providing balance and coherence to the ensemble of existing structures. The construction of two of these buildings was carried out after his death under the supervision of Tommaso dei Cavalieri.

The work went so slowly that Michelangelo could only see the completion of the double staircase which served as the new access to the Palazzo Senatorio, with the positioning of the two statues depicting the two river gods of the “Tiber” and the "Nile.” The façade and the top of the tower was still incomplete, while the Palazzo Nuovo had not started.

=== Equestrian statue of Marcus Aurelius ===
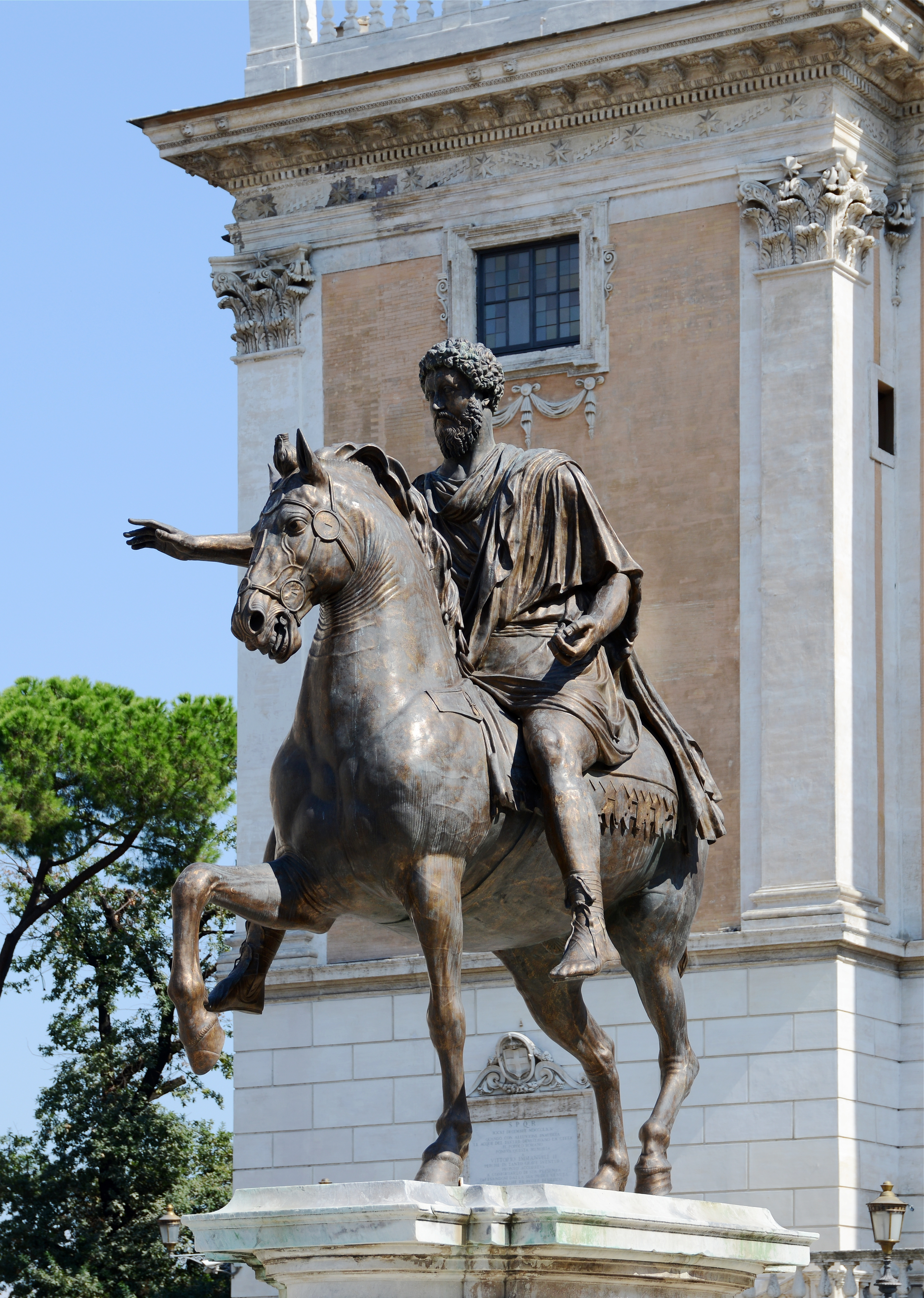
The equestrian statue of Marcus Aurelius, in the center of the Piazza del Campidoglio

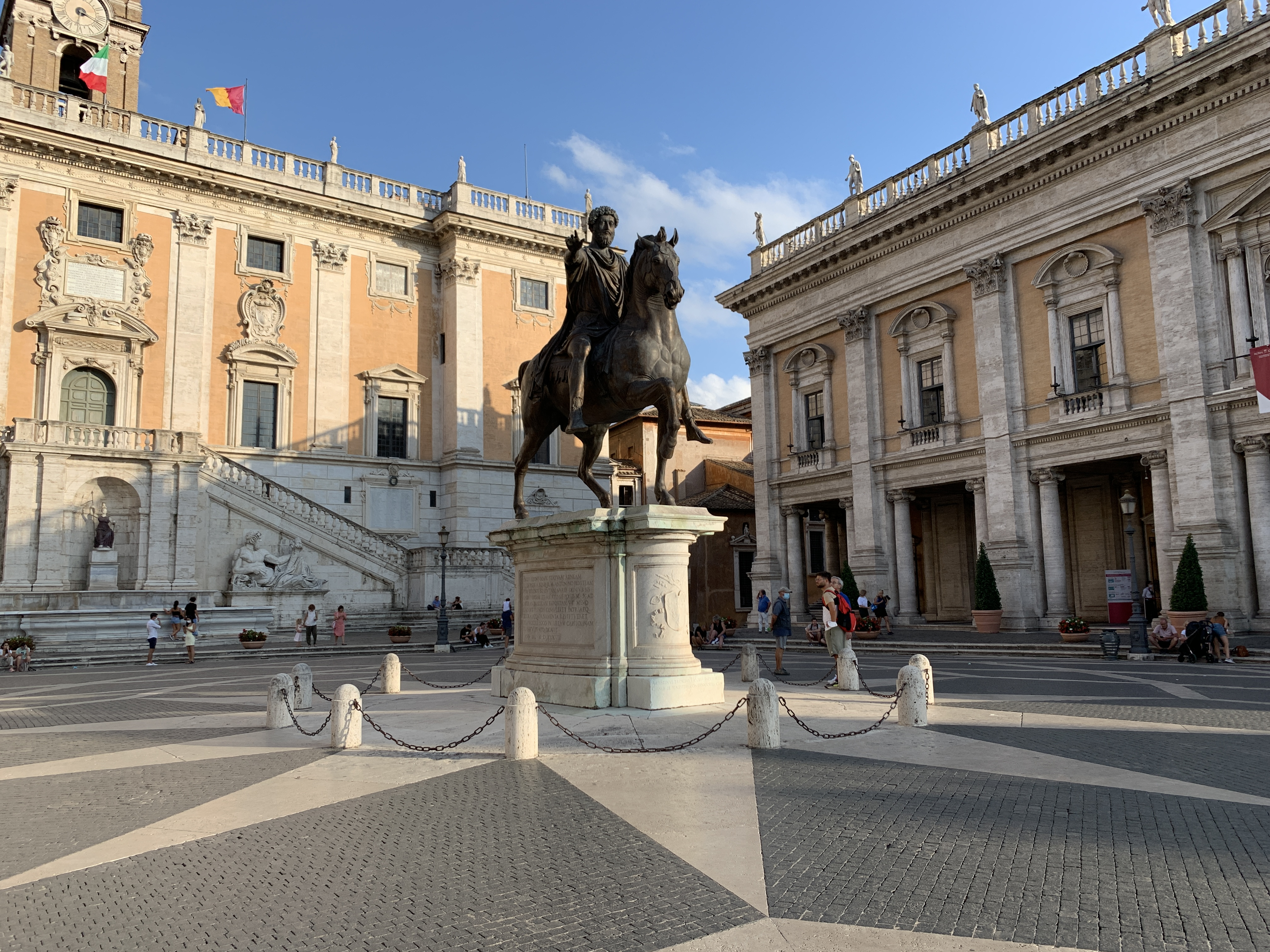
Replica of the equestrian statue of Marcus Aurelius

The Equestrian statue of emperor Marcus Aurelius in a gilded bronze statue, previously located in Piazza San Giovanni (where the Lateran Obelisk is now). Michelangelo positioned the statue to stand in the center of the square set in a paved oval field. The original statue, after restoration, is now kept in the Capitoline Museums, while a copy of it has been placed in the square.

Pope Paul III commissioned Michelangelo to provide a setting for the statue and to bring order to an irregular hilltop already encumbered by two crumbling medieval buildings set at an acute angle to one another.

=== Capitoline Museums ===
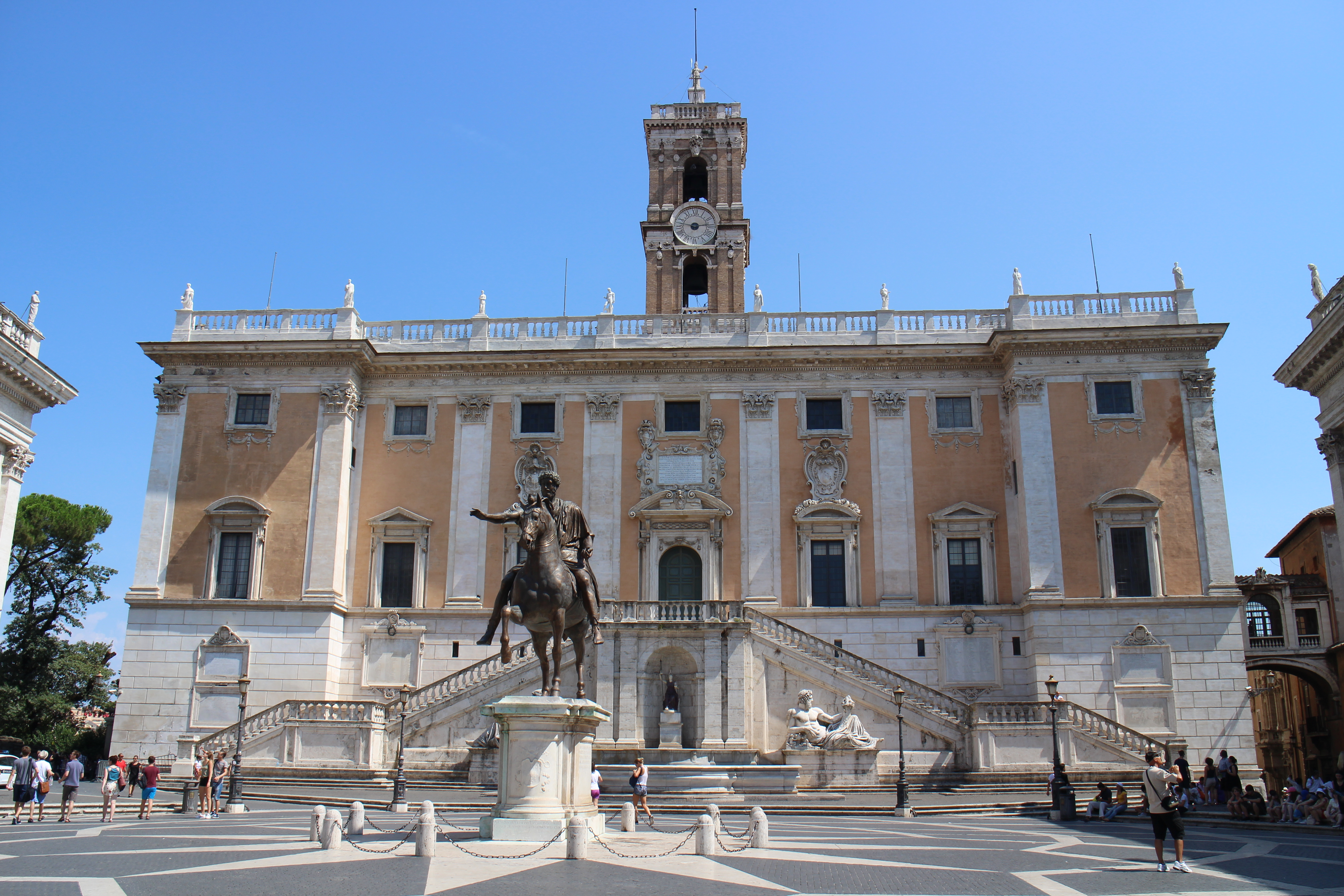
The Capitoline Museums, opened in 1734, are a group of art and archaeological museums in Piazza del Campidoglio.

The Capitoline Museums (Italian: Musei Capitolini) are a group of art and archaeological museums in the Piazza del Campidoglio. They include the Palazzo dei Conservatori, Palazzo Senatorio, and Palazzo Nuovo. The three palazzi are now home to the Capitoline Museums.

The Palazzo Senatorio and Palazzo dei Conservatori form an 80° angle, on which he aligned the new façades, to expand the perspective towards the visual focus by the Palazzo Senatorio. For this purpose, Michelangelo had the idea of building a new building, Palazzo Nuovo, to close off the perspective towards the basilica of Santa Maria in Ara Coeli and to pave the square.

=== Palazzo dei Conservatori ===
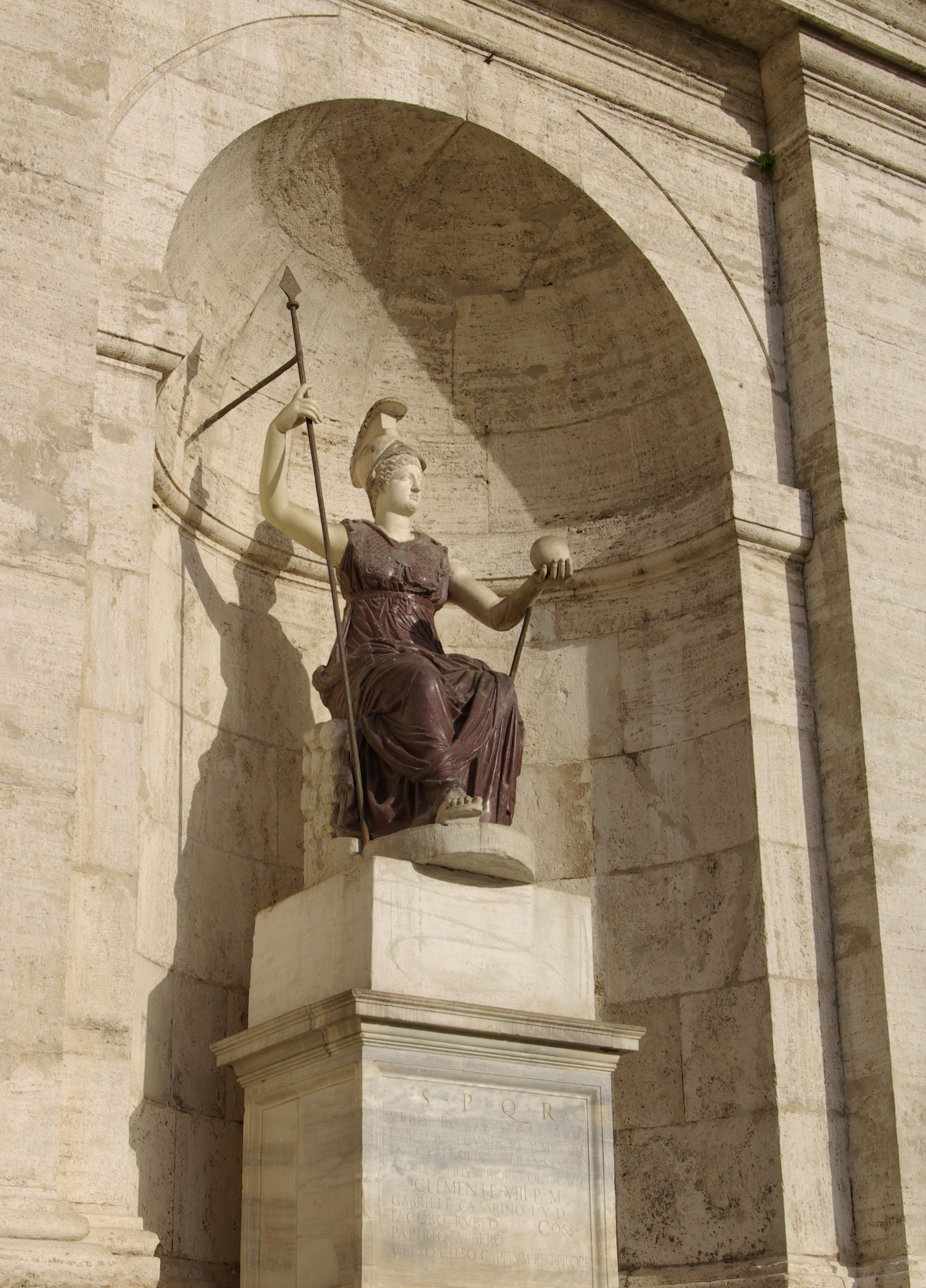
The statue of the "Goddess Rome"

The Palazzo dei Conservatori (English: Palace of the Conservatories) was built in 1453, when Pope Nicholas V had Italian sculptor and architect Bernardo Rossellino build the palazzo on top of a sixth-century Temple of Jupiter Optimus Maximus, to create the headquarters for the local magistrates, named Conservatore of Rome. Today, portions of the temple podium and foundations can be seen behind the Palazzo dei Conservatori, in an exhibition area built in the Caffarelli Garden, and within the Capitoline Museums. A part of the eastern corner is also visible in the via del Tempio di Giove.

The front porch of the Palazzo dei Conservatori sheltered offices of various guilds. Here disputes arising in the transaction of business were adjudicated, unless they were of sufficient importance to go before a communal tribunal, such as that of the conservatori. It was a natural place for such activity. Until the 1470s the main market of the city was held on and around the Campidoglio, while cattle continued to be taxed and sold in the ancient forum located just to the south.

Rossellino built a building with a round arched portico on the ground floor and a façade with cross windows and paired loggias. The orientation of the pre-existing structures was preserved according to a design principle identical to the one that Rossellino implemented subsequently in the town of Pienza, creating a trapezoidal square. The renovation also involved the Palazzo Senatorio, but were interrupted by the death of the pope.

The Capitoline Wolf sculpture was housed in 1471 in the Palazzo dei Conservatori.

The 15th-century Palazzo dei Conservatori, at the Capitoline Museums, was almost demolished in 1540 by Michelangelo, but the fifteenth-century design was documented in the drawings by the Dutch painter Maarten van Heemskerck made between 1536 and 1538. He redesigned the Palazzo dei Conservatori, removing all the previous structures and matching it with the Palazzo Senatorio. He added a double stairway which was used to access the new entrance, no longer facing the forums but towards the square. He also modified the façade, in order to bring it into line with that of the Palazzo dei Conservatori and that of the Palazzo Nuovo facing the church of Santa Maria in Ara Coeli inserting pilasters of giant order, which appeared for the first time in the public buildings, a cornice with a baluster (another new element) and a tower. He added a portico façade to the Palazzo dei Conservatori and inserted giant order pilasters and a balustraded cornice with statues. Michelangelo also designed the steep ramp staircase of the Cordonata and the balustrade from which one overlooks the underlying Piazza d'Aracoeli at the base of Capitoline Hill.

=== Palazzo Senatorio ===
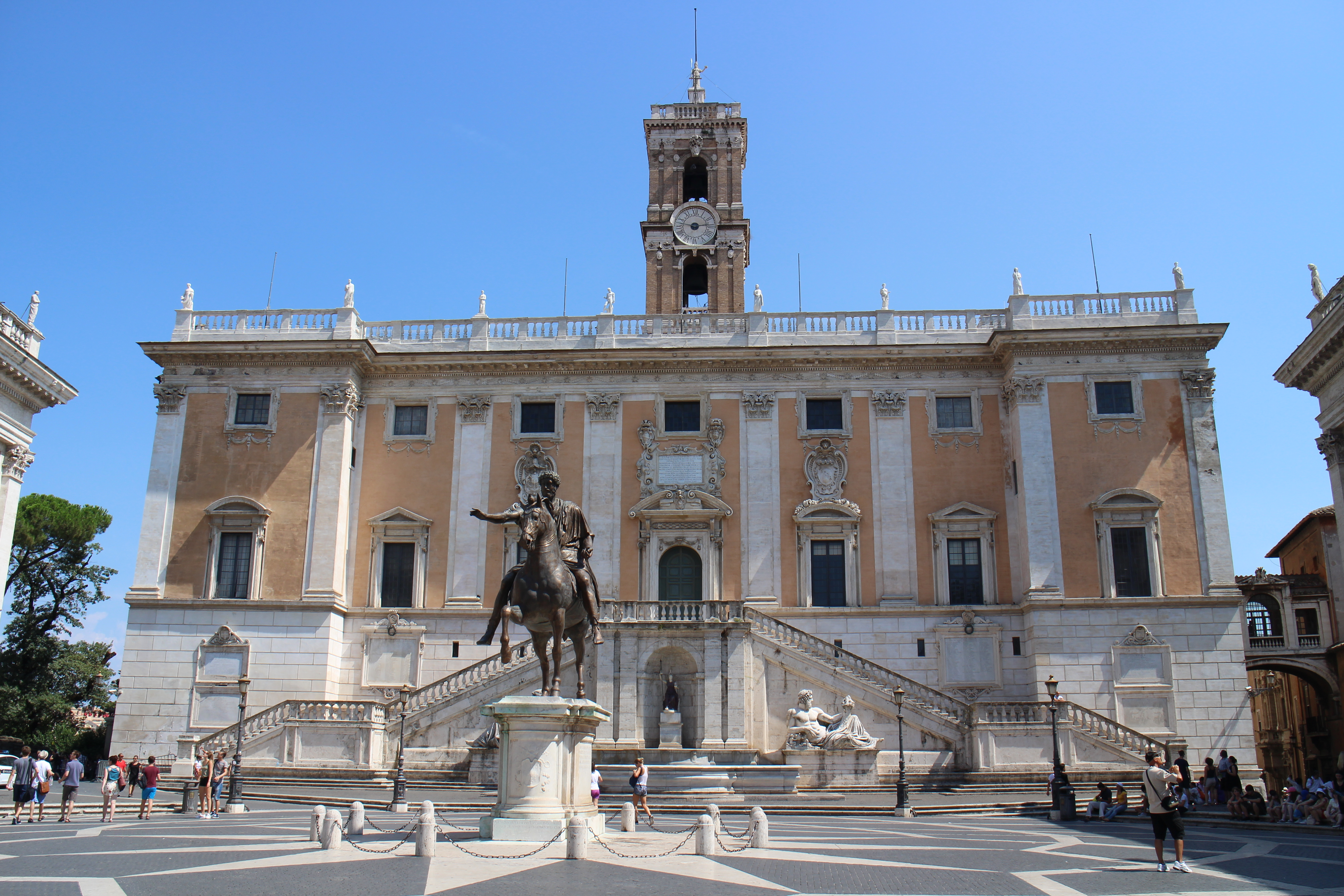
The Palazzo Senatorio showing the double stairway

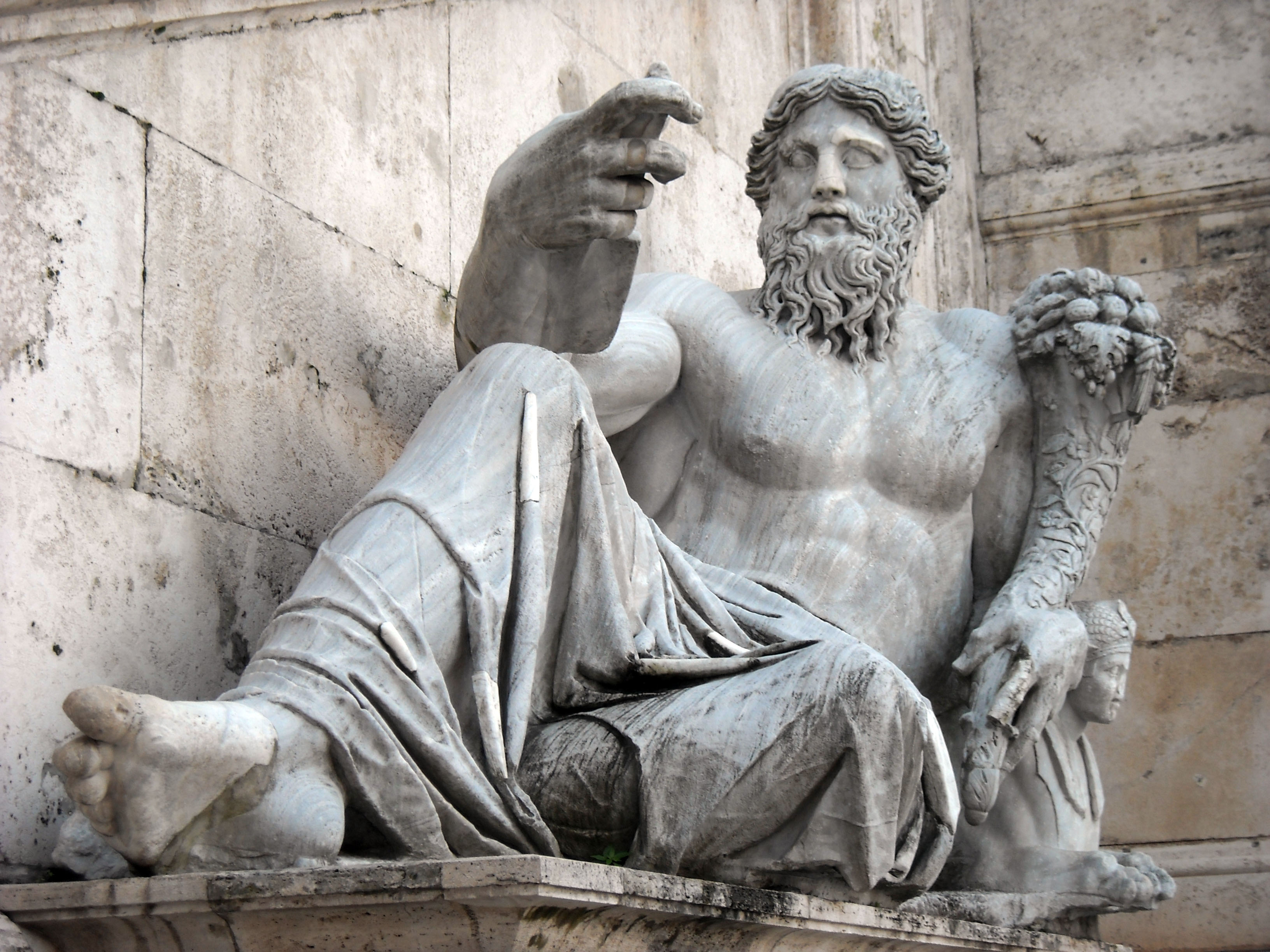
The statue of the "Nile"

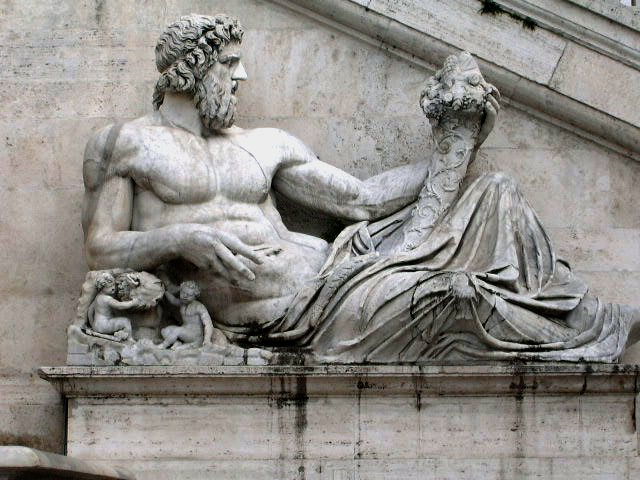
The statue of the “Tevere”, originally the “Tigris”

The Palazzo Senatorio (English: Senatorial palace) was built during the 13th and 14th centuries. It stands atop the Tabularium, which had once housed the archives of ancient Rome. Peperino blocks from the Tabularium were re-used in the left side of the palazzo and a corner of the belltower. It now houses the Roman city hall, after having been converted into a residence by Giovanni Battista Piranesi for the Senator Abbondio Rezzonico in the 18th century.

Its double ramp of stairs was designed by Michelangelo. This double stairway to the palazzo replaced the old flight of steps and two-storied loggia, which had stood on the right side of the palazzo. The staircase cannot be seen solely in terms of the building to which it belongs but must be set in the context of the piazza as a whole. The steps, beginning at the center of each wing, move gently upward until they reach the inner corner, level off and recede to the main surface of the façade. They then continue an unbroken stateliness toward each other, converging on the central doorway of the second story. This interruption of the diagonal line and the brief inward change of direction both absorbs the central axis and links the two sides. The fountain in front of the staircase features the river gods of the Tiber and the Nile as well as Dea Roma. The upper part of the facade was designed by Michelangelo with colossal corinthian pilasters matching with the two other buildings. Its bell-tower was designed by Martino Longhi the Elder and built between 1578 and 1582. Its current facade was built by Giacomo della Porta and Girolamo Rainaldi. Porta did the completion of the façade of the Palazzo Senatorio, including the positioning, in the central niche, of a statue of Athena taken from the Palazzo dei Conservatori, which in 1593. was replaced with another statue of Athena much smaller, in red porphyry and white marble.

In 1587, when the branch of the new aqueduct of the Acqua Felice reached the Campidoglio, Pope Sixtus V announced a public competition for the construction of a fountain on the square. Matteo Bartolani's project was the winner. Bartolani was the architect who was initially commissioned to build the Acqua Felice aqueduct. It was a big project, which was only partially realized with the construction of two tanks leaning against the center of the façade of the Palazzo Senatorio, between the statues of the two rivers and under the niche containing Athena.

=== Palazzo Nuovo ===
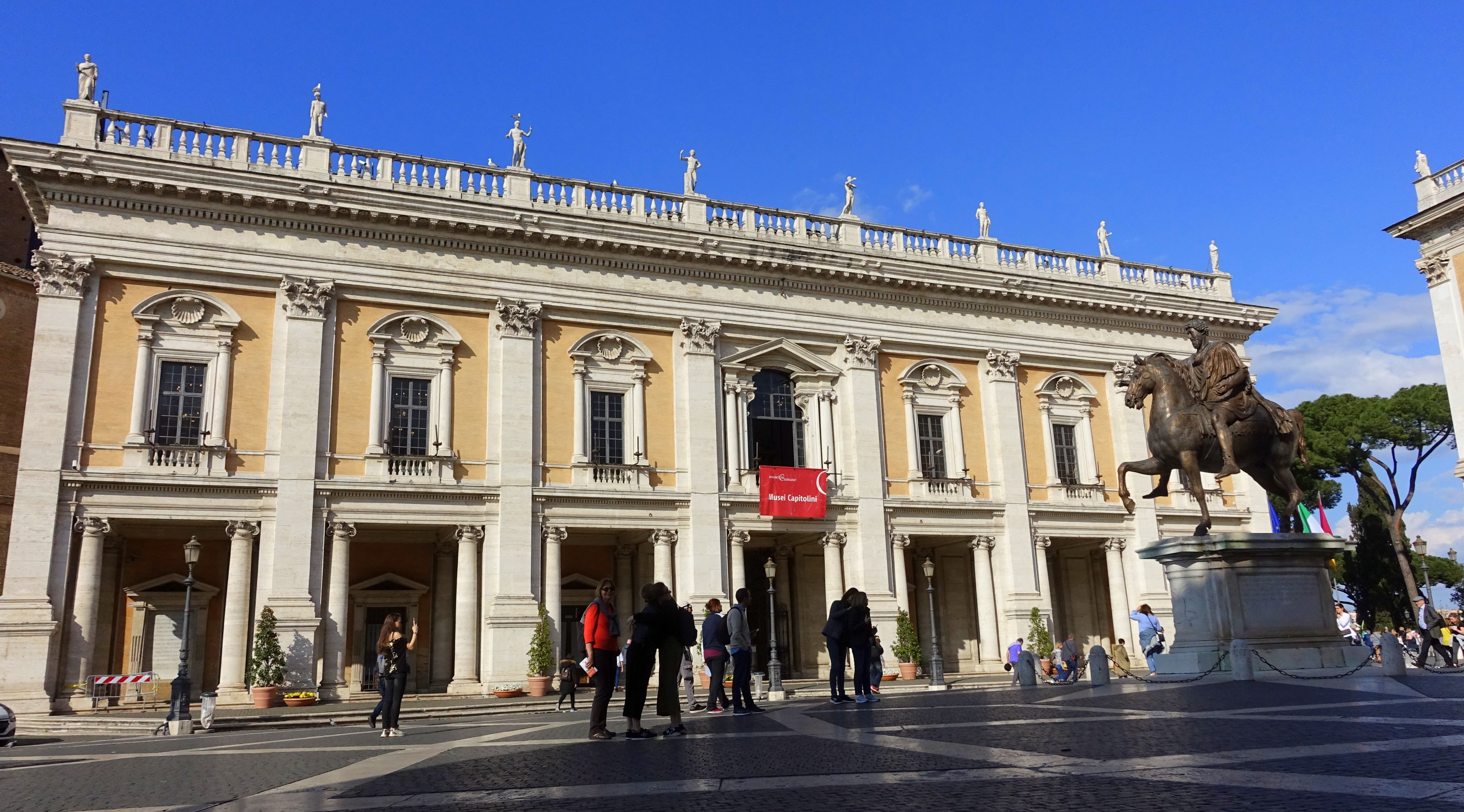
The Palazzo Nuovo at the Capitoline Museums

The Palazzo Nuovo (English: New Palace) was constructed in 1603 to close off the piazza's symmetry and hide the tower of the Santa Maria in Ara Coeli. It was finished in 1654 and opened to the public in 1734. Its façade is an identical copy of the Palazzo dei Conservatori, made using Michelangelo's blueprint when he redesigned the Palazzo dei Conservatori a century earlier.

=== Cordonata ===
The Cordonata (Italian word, from cordone, which in architecture means "linear element which emphasizes a limit") is a wide-ramped road, gradually ascending from the city to the hilltop. It is decorated with various sculptural works. It was built to be wide enough for horse riders to ascend the hill without dismounting. In addition to the statues of the two Egyptian lions in black basalt placed at the base, towards the middle of the climb on the grassy clearing on the left, there is the Monument to Cola di Rienzo of the politician Cola di Rienzo (1313-1354), installed in 1886. At the top of the cordonata are the statues of the Dioscuri, the marble renditions of Castor and Pollux, from the Temple of Castor and Pollux, and two statues of marble weapons from the Ninfeo di Alessandro (Mario's Trophies) of the Piazza Vittorio.

The two fountains that in 1588, Della Porta managed to create for the Campidoglio are the two basalt lions on the sides of the base of the cordonata. They were transferred in 1582 from the remains of the "Temple of Isis", which were completed with two marble vases specially built to collect water. The two original lions were transferred in 1885 to the Vatican Museums, but then put back in their place in 1955.

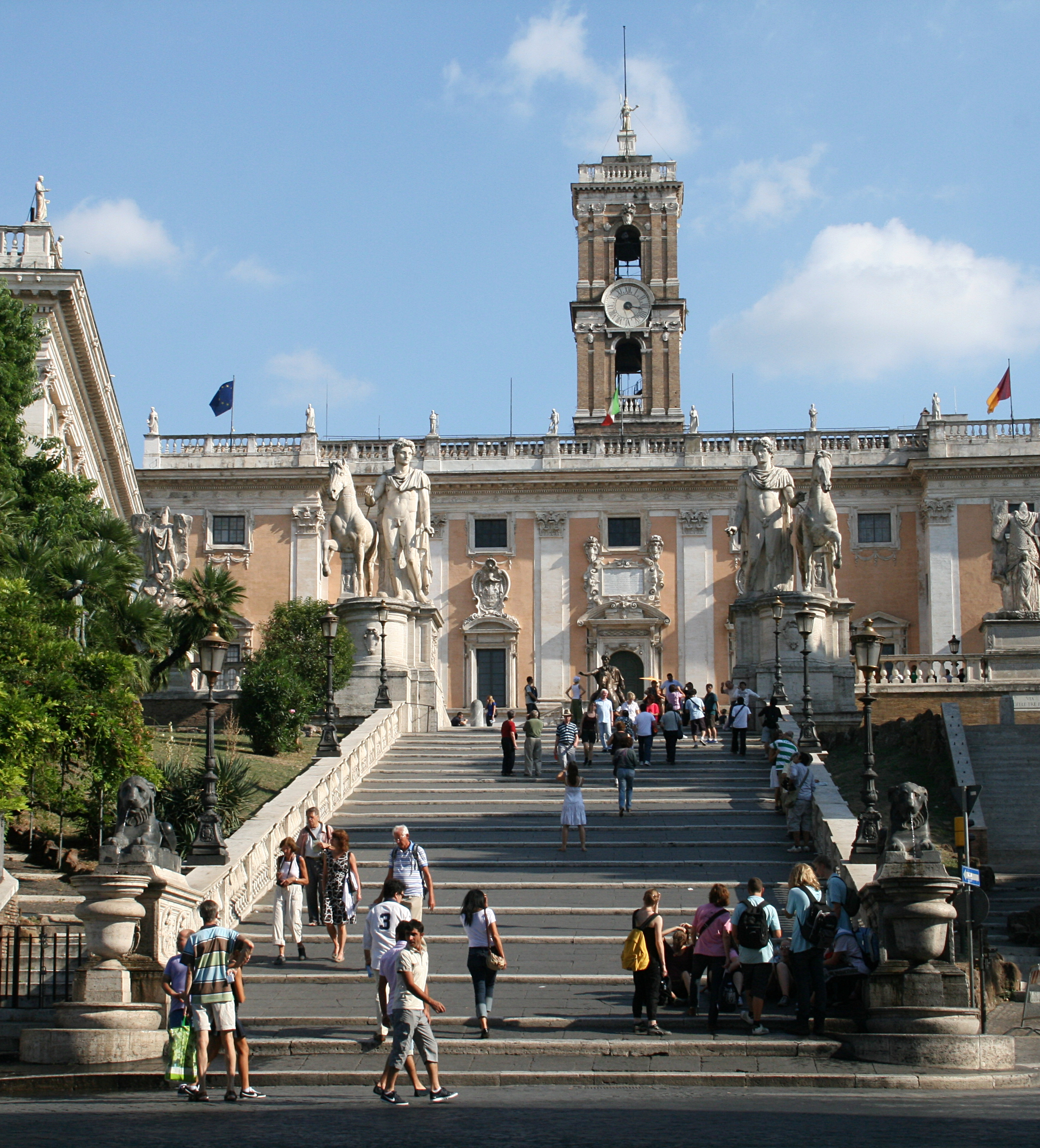
The "Cordonata" access to Piazza del Campidoglio, with the statues of the Dioscuri

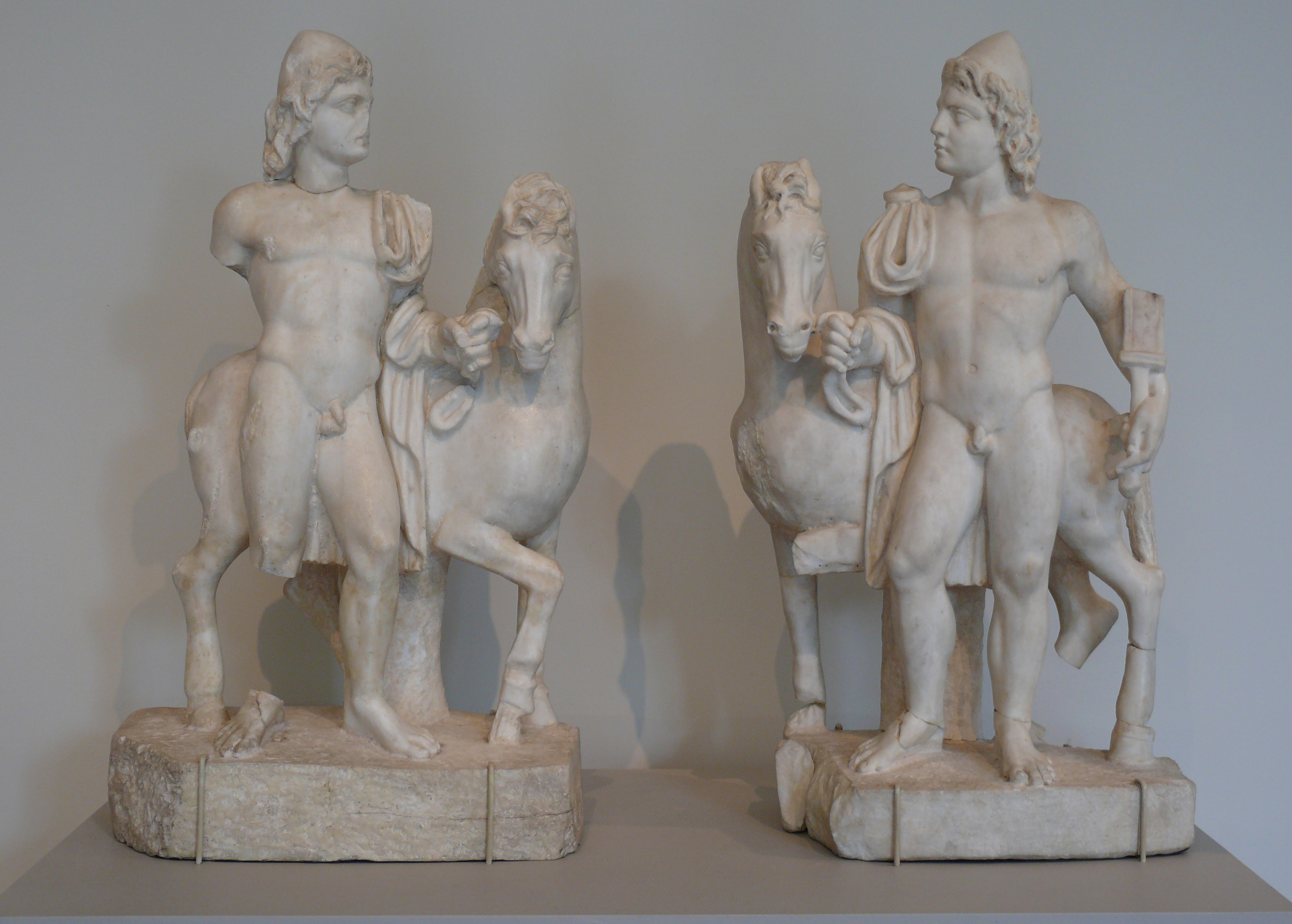
The Castor and Pollux Roman 3C AD

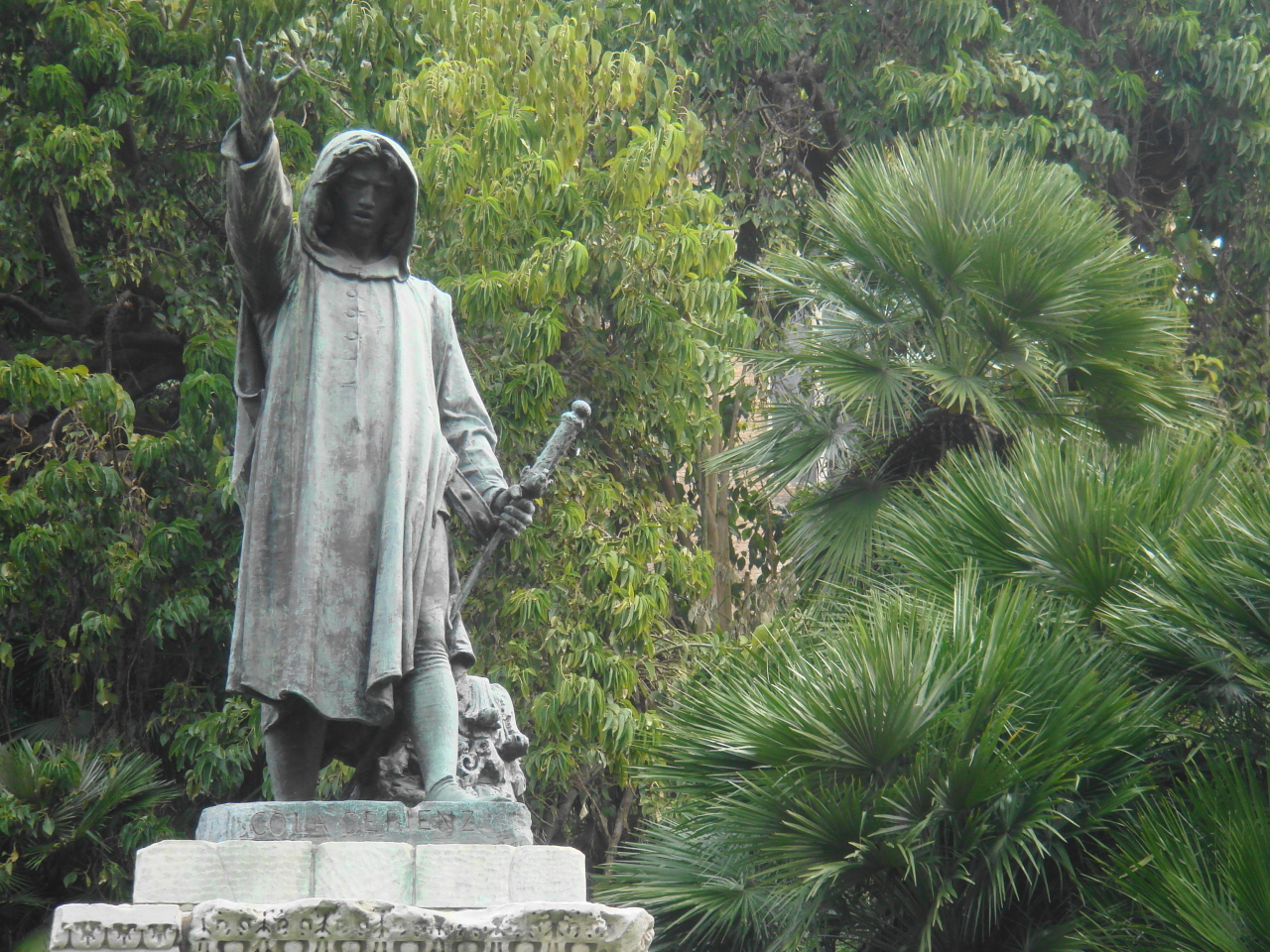
Monument of the politician Cola di Rienzo

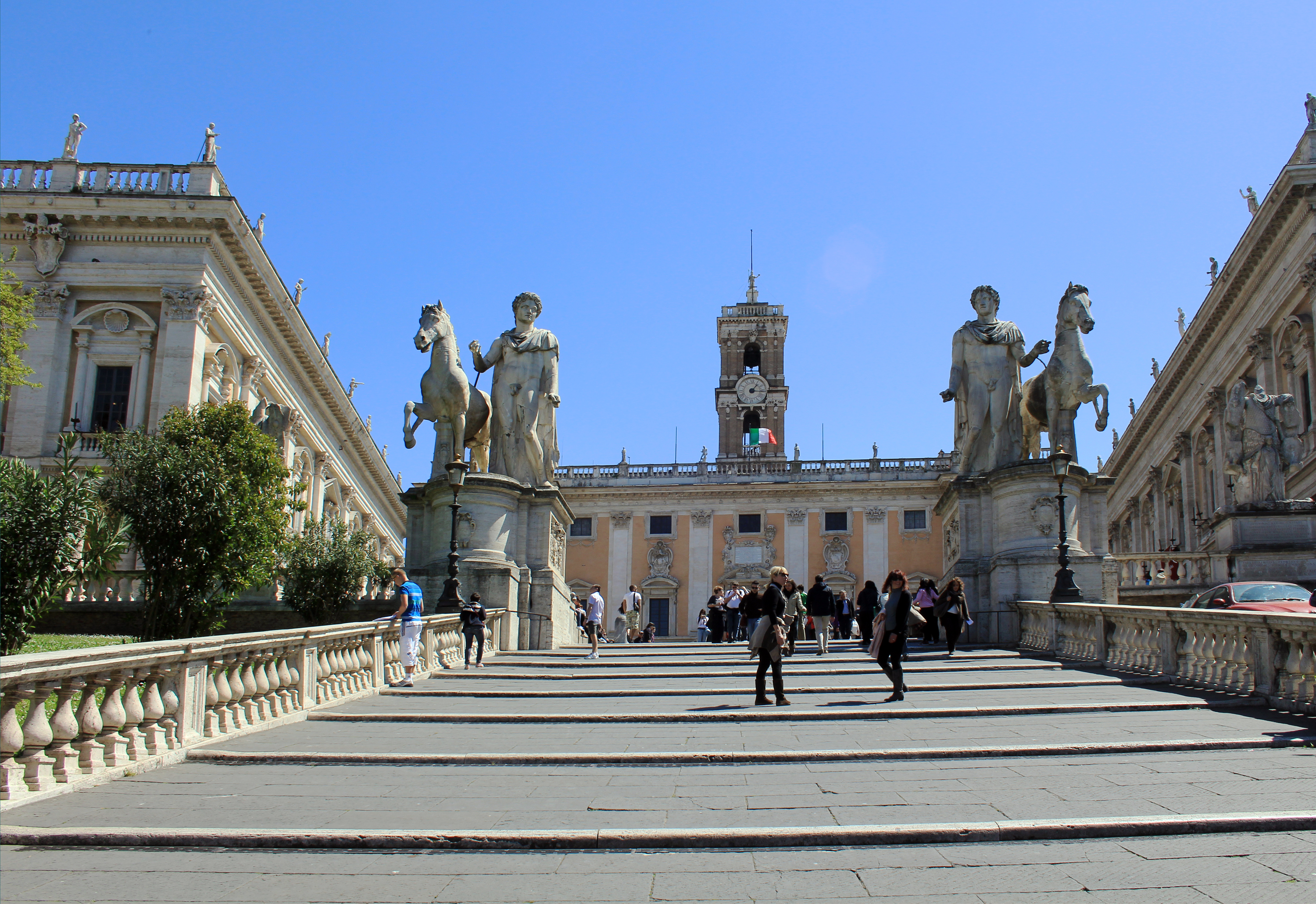
The Capitoline Hill cordonata leading from Via del Teatro di Marcello to Piazza del Campidoglio

=== Final interventions ===
The Campidoglio square was finished in the 17th century. Benito Mussolini ordered that the paving for the square be completed to Michelangelo's design, done by Antonio Muñoz (1884-1960) in 1940, based from a print by Étienne Dupérac.

The geometric paving of the square and the equestrian statue of Marcus Aurelius appear on the reverse of the 50 euro cents minted in Italy, and on all the pages of the Italian passport. A view of the square is on the front of the 10,000 lire banknotes, the so-called "Michelangelo", issued by the Bank of Italy from 1962 to 1977.

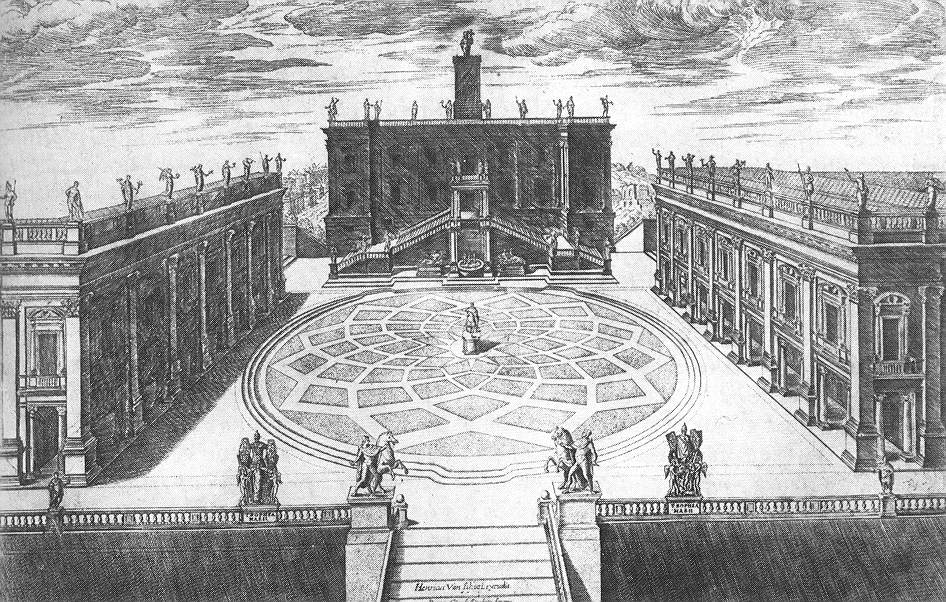
Engraving by Étienne Dupérac, which was used to reproduce Michelangelo's design of the pavement that it:Antonio Muñoz used to create the current pavement in 1940

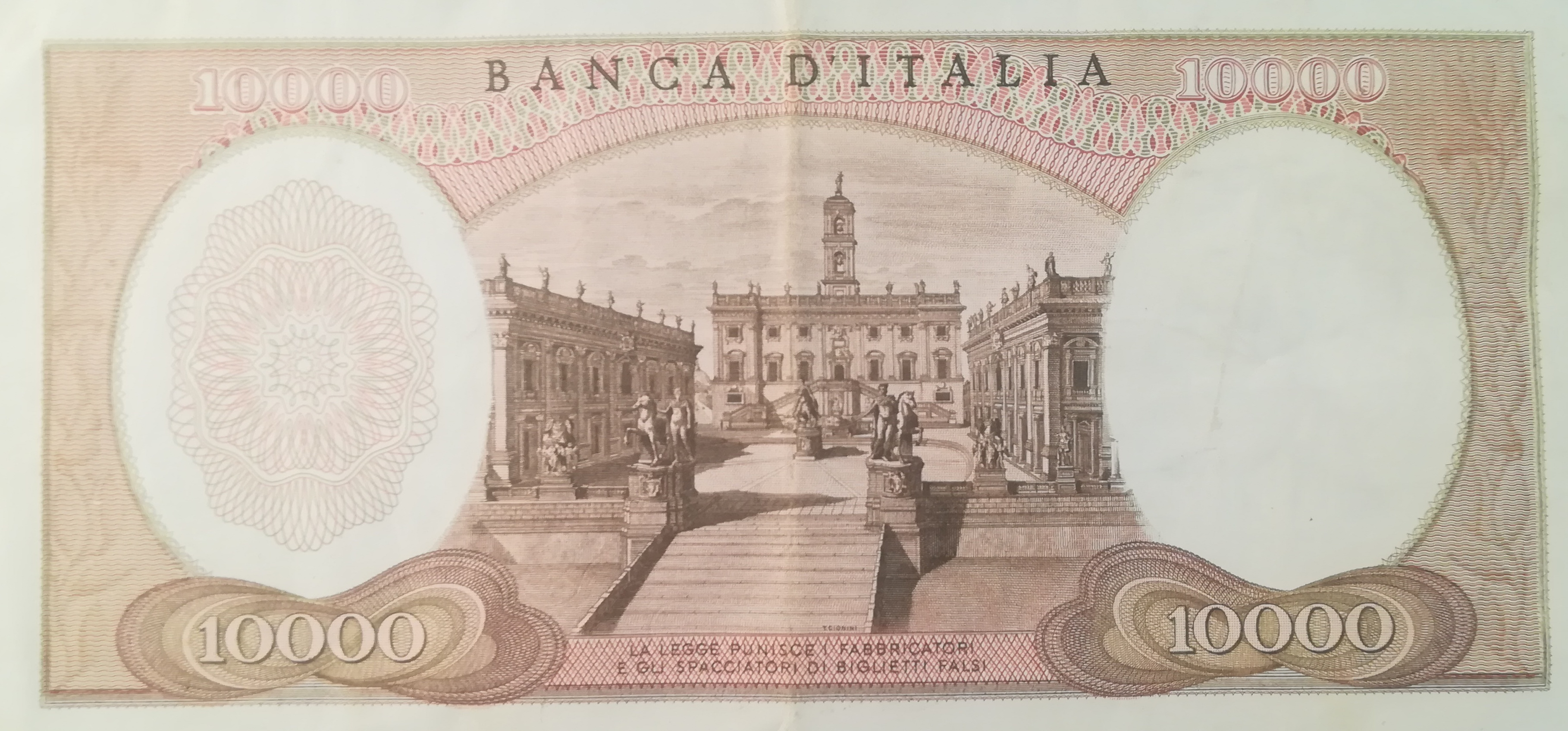
Ten thousand lire banknote

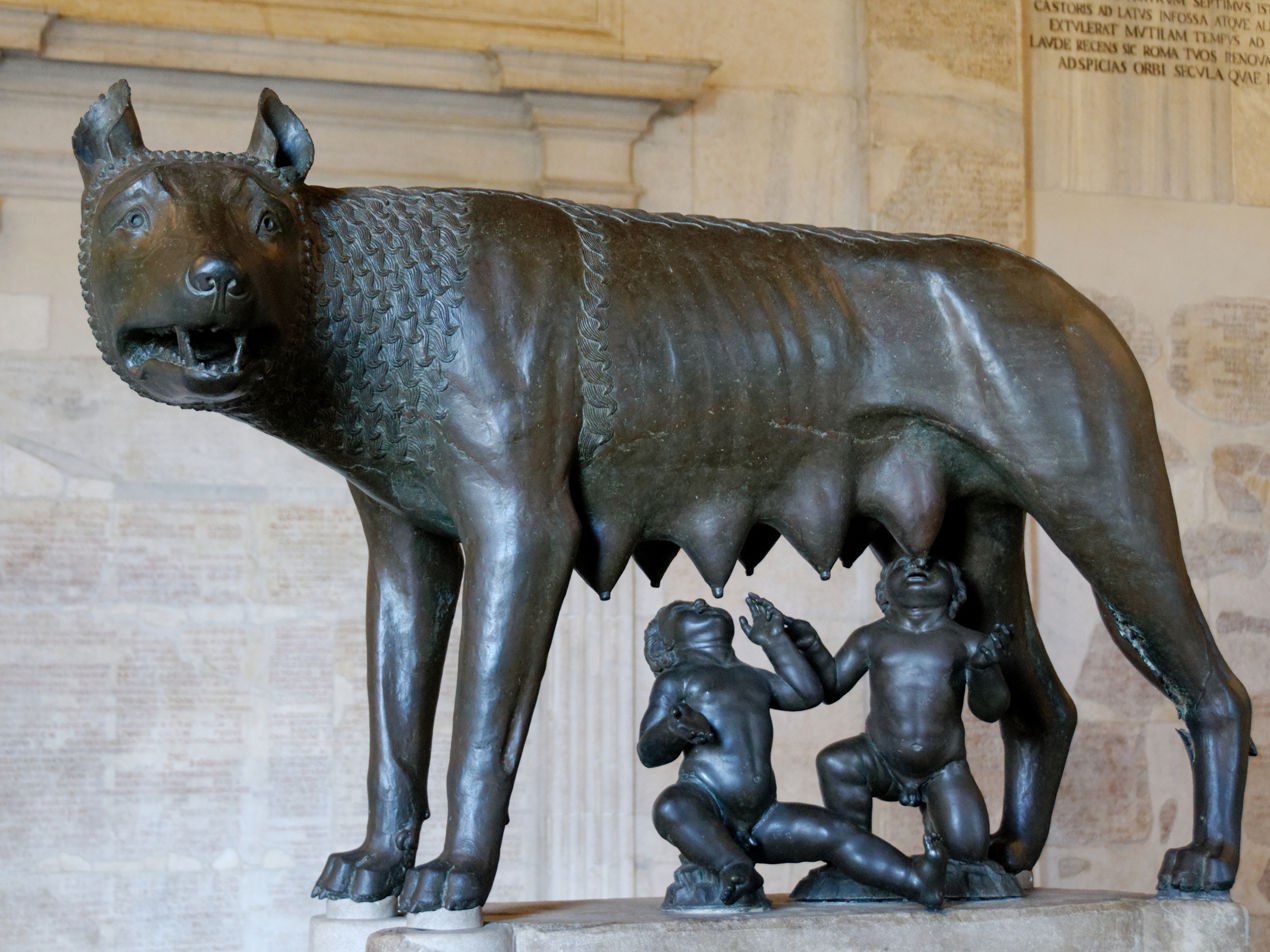
The Capitoline Wolf, bronze sculpture

== See also ==
- Capitol (disambiguation)
- History of Rome
- Via del Corso

== Bibliography ==
- Albertoni, M.; Damiani, I. (2008). Il tempio di Giove e le origini del colle Capitolino (in Italian). Milan: Electa.
- Claridge, Amanda (1998). Rome. Oxford Archaeological Guides. Oxford: Oxford University Press. ISBN 0-19-288003-9.
- Coarelli, Filippo (2014). Rome and Environs: An Archaeological Guide. University of California Press. ISBN 978-0-520-28209-4.
