= Giacomo Colonna =

Giacomo Colonna or Jacopo Colonna may refer to:

- Giacomo Colonna (cardinal) (died 1318), enemy of Pope Boniface VIII
- Giacomo Sciarra Colonna (died 1329), nephew of the cardinal
- Giacomo Colonna (bishop) (died 1341), son of Stefano Colonna the Elder and nephew of Sciarra
- Giacomo Colonna, person who found the Letter of Lentulus in 1421
- Giacomo Colonna (died 1431), Neapolitan official, chamberlain of Joanna II of Naples
- Jacopo Colonna (sculptor) (died 1540)
