= Cordonata =

Sloping road composed of transversal stripes

Coordinates: 41°53′37″N 12°28′56″E

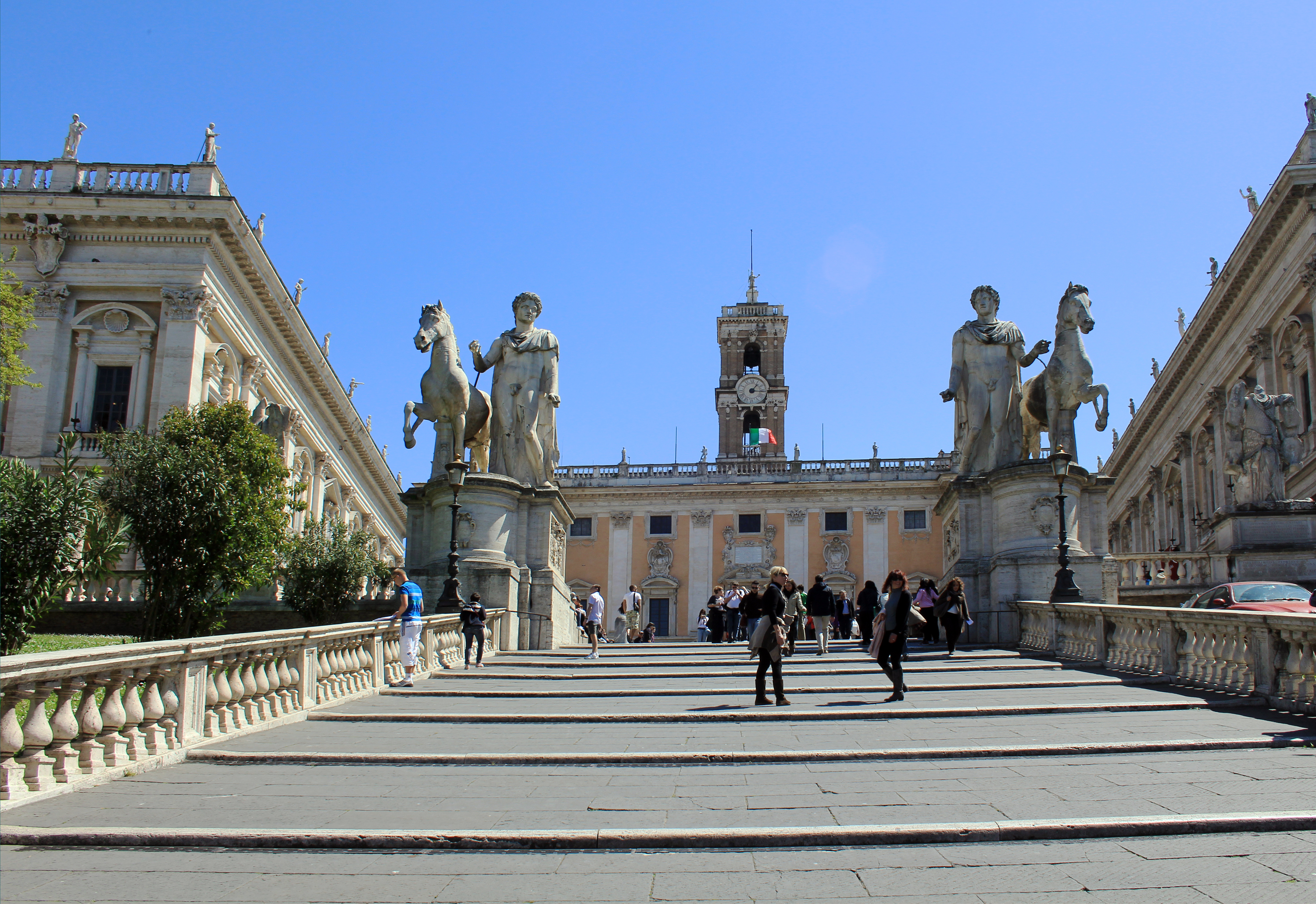
The Capitoline Hill cordonata in Rome, leading from Piazza d'Aracoeli to Piazza del Campidoglio

The cordonata (Italian word, from cordone, which in architecture means "linear element which emphasizes a limit") is a sloping road interrupted at regular distances by low (8-10 cm) steps in the form of transversal stripes (cordoni) made of stone or bricks. It has a form almost similar to a flight of steps, but allows the transit of horses and donkeys.

Famous Italian cordonate in Rome:

- Cordonata Capitolina leading from Piazza d'Aracoeli to Piazza del Campidoglio, designed and built by Giacomo della Porta in 1581–82 after Michelangelo's plans
- Via della Cordonata leading to the Piazza del Quirinale.
