= Stefano Colonna =

Wikimedia disambiguation page

Stefano Colonna was the name of several members of the Italian family of Colonna. The most important include:

- Stefano Colonna the Elder (1265 – c. 1348) was son of Giovanni Colonna and one of the most important political figures in Rome in the first half of the 14th century. He was heir of the Papal fief of Palestrina. In 1290 he was named count of Romagna, and he was several times Senator of Rome and Imperial vicar in Italy. A staunch Ghibelline, he struggled for large part of his life against the Guelph Orsini family. He was a protector of Petrarch, who dedicated two sonnets and other works to him. He was also a fierce opponent of Cola di Rienzo, leader of the popular rebellion of Rome in 1347. He was brother to Sciarra Colonna.
- Stefano Colonna the Younger (died 1347), son of the former, was Senator of Rome in 1306 and 1330. He was killed (together with his sons Giovanni and Camillo) at the battle of Porta San Lorenzo (1347) against the troops of Cola di Rienzo.
- Stefanello (died c. 1368), son of the former, was the first of the Palestrina branch of the family.
- Stefano Colonna di Palestrina (16th century). Commander of the Florentine militia during the siege of Florence.
- Stefano Colonn (1320/1325 – 1378/1379). Cardinal appointed by Pope Urban VI in 1378.

== See also ==
- Colonna family
