= Monument to Cola di Rienzo =

Coordinates: 41°53′37″N 12°28′56″E

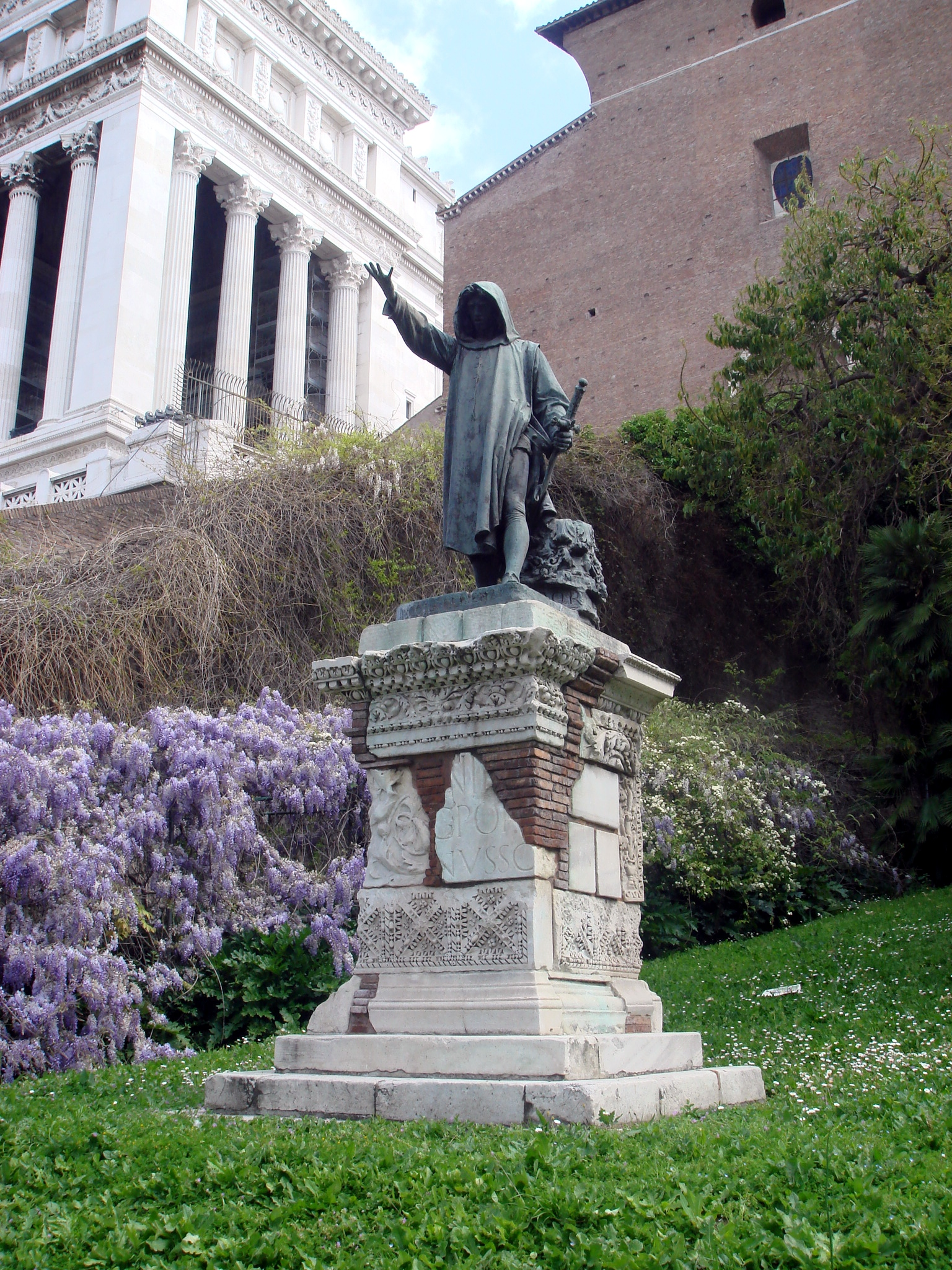
- Interactive map of Monument to Cola di Rienzo
- Location: Rome, Italy
- Designer: Girolamo Masini (statue); Francesco Azzurri (base)
- Type: Statue
- Material: Bronze
- Dedicated date: 20 September 1887
- Dedicated to: Cola di Rienzo

The Monument to Cola di Rienzo is a bronze statue dedicated to the 14th-century Roman politician and military leader, and prominently displayed in the space between the steps leading up to the Campidoglio (the cordonata) and the steps leading up to Santa Maria in Aracoeli, in Rome, Italy.

== History and description ==
As the city neared the 25th anniversary of the capture and annexation of Rome to the Kingdom of Italy, which had wrested the city from the temporal rule of the papacy, plans were made to install monuments related to the project of a unified Italy. In 1886, the minister of Education in Rome, Biagio Placidi, proposed the construction of a monument to Cola di Rienzo. With the support of the mayor, Leopoldo Torlonia and the city council, bought a bronze statue that had been cast in 1870 by the sculptor Girolamo Masini.

Finding a location for the statue proved controversial. One initial proposal was to site the statue in Piazza Cola di Rienzo, a small park located in the newly minted urban rione (neighborhood) of Prati, not far from the Vatican itself. The papacy had yet to reconcile with its loss of temporal power over its prior state, and would not have viewed kindly the placement of statue honoring an anti-papal figure within a few minutes walk from the Papal palace.

Ultimately, the site chosen was complex. Positioning near the Campidoglio, which held for centuries the municipal offices of Rome and its senate, was apt for a man who had once postulated himself as the new tribune of what he hoped would be a quasi-republican Rome, freed from the rule of both Papal and powerful Roman families. In addition, Cola di Rienzo had repaired, during his rule, the steps to the Ara Coeli church. Finally, a medieval brick building nearby, close to Santa Maria in Cosmedin was rumored to have been Cola di Rienzo's home. Finally, it was also rumored that the man was executed at the Campidoglio in 1354. However, the statue was placed on an incline of the grassy knoll, with no direct access to foster the aggregation of crowds, or the creation of a new locus for pasquinades.

The statue depicts a standing Cola di Rienzo, his hooded face and wild hair emerging from shadows, his arm raised as if to address the public. The statue faces northwest, towards the center of historic urban Rome, but also towards the Vatican, which had been his nemesis. The base of the statue, completed by Francesco Azzurri is a mosaic made with brick and marble rubble reliefs that had been associated with the steps around this monument. A simple inscription reports his name.

The monument was inaugurated without ceremony on 20 September 1887.
