= Cola di Rienzo =

Medieval Italian populist politician (1313–1354)

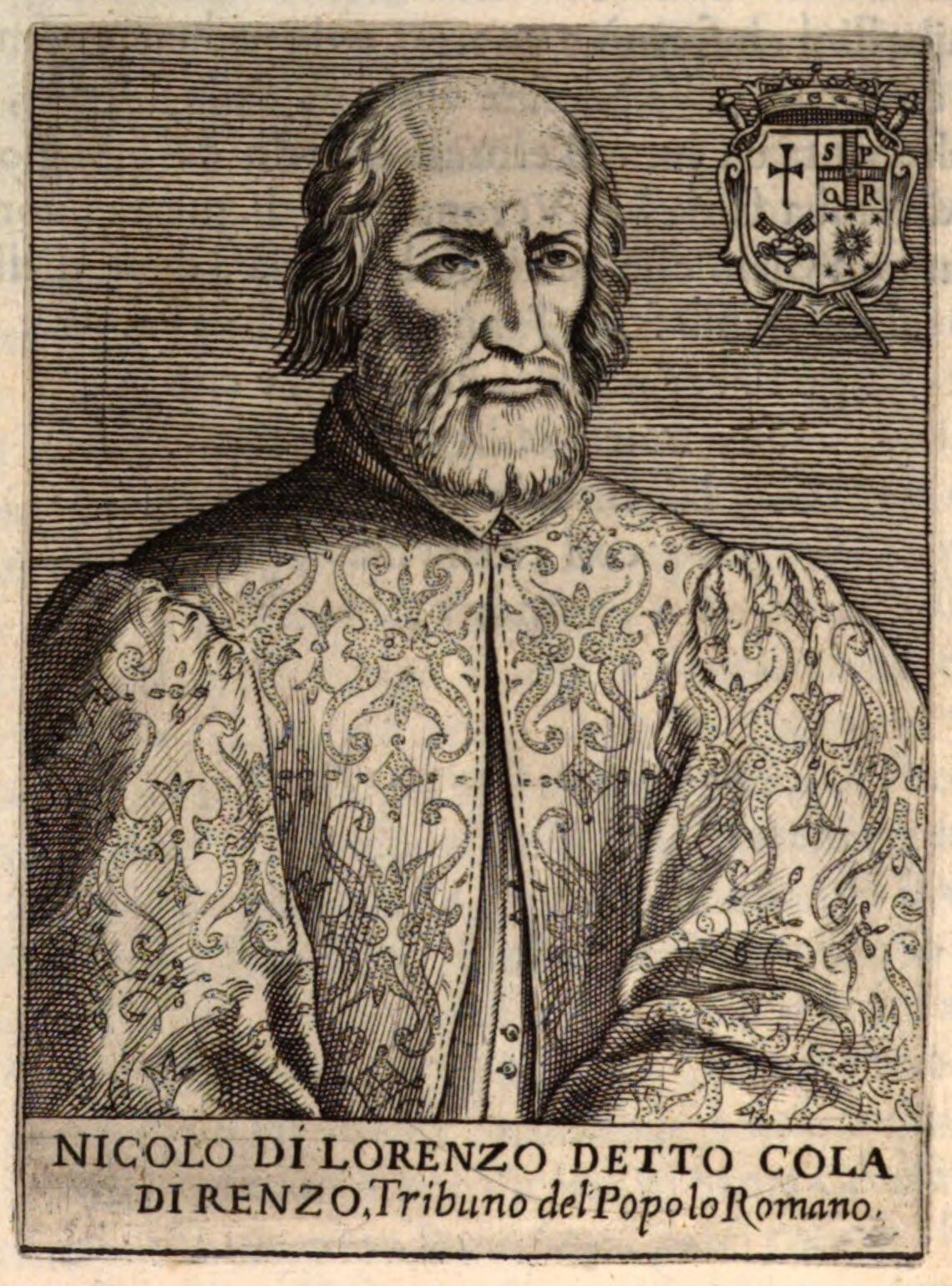
- Cola di Rienzo (1646)

Senator of Rome (De facto ruler of Rome)
- In office 7 September 1354 – 8 October 1354
- Appointed by: Pope Innocent VI

Rector of Rome (De facto ruler of Rome)
- In office 26 June 1347 – 15 December 1347
- Appointed by: Pope Clement VI

Personal details
- Born: Nicola di Lorenzo Gabrini; 1313 Rome, Papal States
- Died: 8 October 1354 (aged 40–41) Rome, Papal States
- Party: Guelph (Pro-Papacy)
- Profession: Notary; Civil servant

Nicola di Lorenzo Gabrini (1313 – 8 October 1354), commonly known as Cola di Rienzo (Italian: [ˈkɔːla di ˈrjɛntso]) or Rienzi, was an Italian politician and leader, who styled himself as the "tribune of the Roman people".

During his lifetime, he advocated for the unification of Italy. This led to Cola's re-emergence in the 19th century as an iconic figure among leaders of liberal nationalism, who adopted him as a precursor of the 19th-century Risorgimento.

== Biography ==
=== Early life and career ===
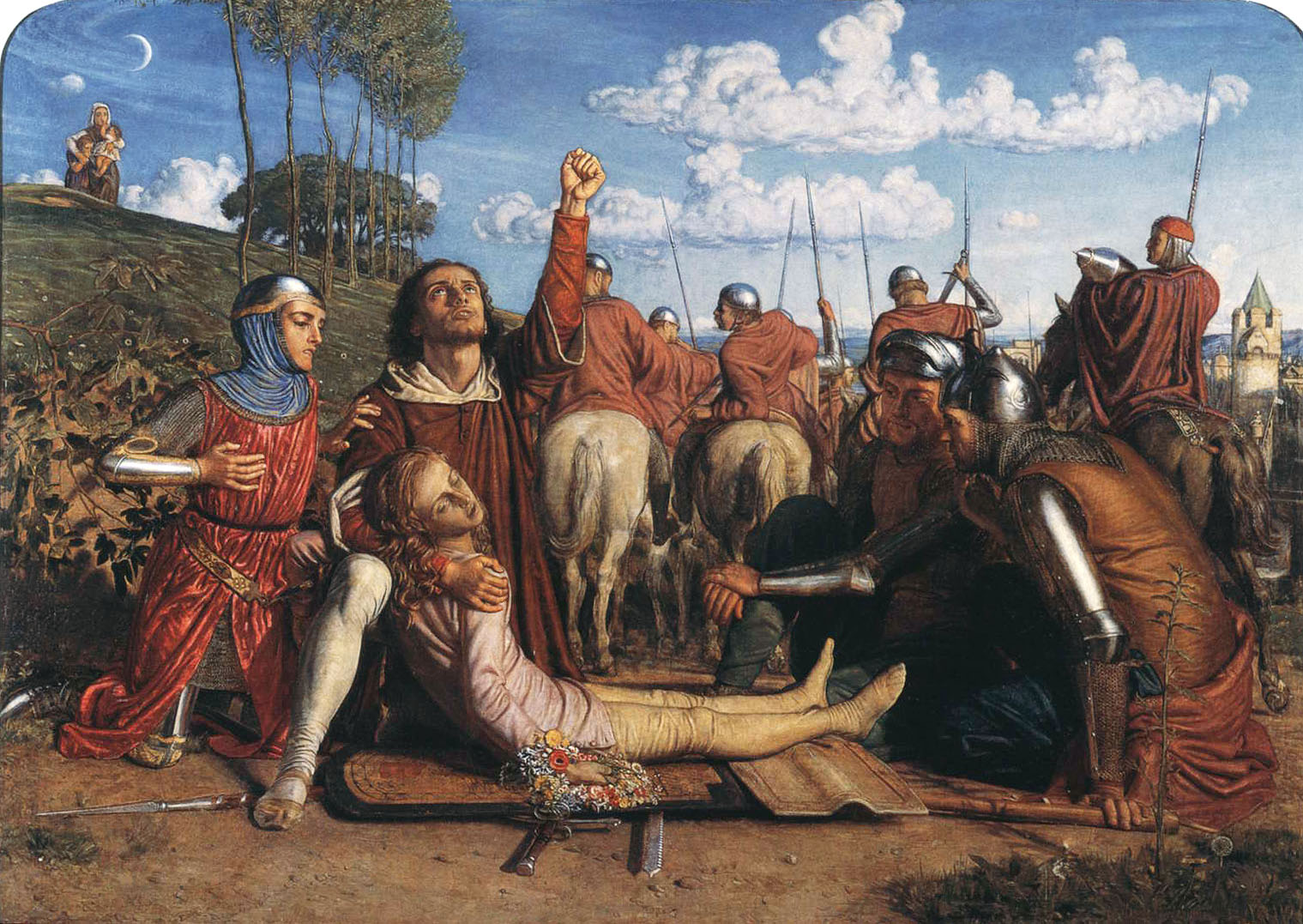
Rienzi vowing to obtain justice for the death of his young brother by William Holman Hunt, 1848–49

Nicola was born in Rome of humble origins. He claimed to be the natural child of Henry VII, the Holy Roman Emperor, but he was, in fact, born to a washerwoman and a tavern-keeper named Lorenzo Gabrini. Nicola's father's forename was shortened to Rienzo, and his name was shortened to Cola; hence, Cola di Rienzo, or Rienzi, by which he is generally known.

He spent his early years at Anagni, where he devoted much of his time to the study of Latin writers, historians, orators and poets. After having nourished his mind with stories of the glories and the power of ancient Rome, he turned his thoughts to restoring his native city. Knowing Rome was suffering from degradation and wretchedness, Cola sought to restore the city to not only good order but to pristine greatness. His zeal for this work was quickened by the desire to avenge his brother, who had been killed by a noble.

He became a notary and a person of some importance in the city and was sent in 1343 on a public errand to Pope Clement VI at Avignon. He discharged his duties with ability and success. Although he boldly denounced the aristocratic rulers of Rome, he won the favour and esteem of the Pope, who gave him an official position at his court.

=== Leader of revolt ===
After returning to Rome in April 1344, Cola worked for three years at the great object of his life, the restoration of the city to its former position of power. He gathered a band of supporters, plans were drawn up, and at length, all was ready for the insurrection.

On 19 May 1347, heralds invited the people to a parliament on the Capitol and on 20 May, Whit-Sunday, the meeting took place. Dressed in full armour and attended by the papal vicar, Cola headed a procession to the Capitol, where he addressed the assembled crowd, speaking "with fascinating eloquence of the servitude and redemption of Rome." A new series of laws was published and accepted with acclaim, and unlimited authority and power was given to the author of the revolution.

Without striking a blow the nobles left the city or went into hiding, and a few days later Rienzo took the title of tribune. He called himself "Nicholaus, severus et clemens, libertatis, pacis justiciaeque tribunus, et sacræ Romanæ Reipublicæ liberator," or "Nicholas, severe and clement, tribune of liberty, peace and justice, and liberator of the Holy Roman Republic."

=== Tribune of Rome ===
Cola governed the city with a stern justice, which was in marked contrast to the previous reign of license and disorder. As a result of his leadership, the tribune was received at St. Peter's with the hymn Veni Creator Spiritus, while in a letter, the poet Petrarch urged him to continue his great and noble work, and congratulated him on his past achievements, calling him the new Camillus, Brutus and Romulus. All the nobles submitted, though with great reluctance; the roads were cleared of robbers; some severe examples of justice intimidated offenders, and the tribune was regarded by many as the destined restorer of Rome and Italy.

=== Attempt to unify Italy ===
In July, in a decree, he proclaimed the sovereignty of the Roman people over the empire. But before this he had set to work on restoring the authority of Rome over the cities and provinces of Italy, of making the city again caput mundi. He wrote letters to the cities of Italy, asking them to send representatives to an assembly which would meet on 1 August, when the formation of a great federation under the headship of Rome would be considered. On the appointed day, a number of representatives appeared, and Cola issued an edict citing the Holy Roman Emperor Louis IV and his rival Charles of Luxembourg, and also the imperial electors and all others concerned in the dispute, to appear before him in order that he might pronounce judgment. The following day, the festival of the unity of Italy was celebrated, but neither this nor the previous meeting had any practical result. Cola's power, however, was recognized in the Kingdom of Naples, and both Joanna I of Naples and her rival claimant of the throne of Naples, Louis I of Hungary, appealed to him for protection and aid, and on 15 August with great pomp he was crowned Tribune. Ferdinand Gregorovius says this ceremony "was the fantastic caricature in which ended the imperium of Charles the Great. A world where political action was represented in such guise was ripe for overthrow or could only be saved by a great mental reformation."

=== End of rule ===
He then seized but soon released many barons including Stefano Colonna who had spoken disparagingly of him, in exchange for the title prince of Palestrina, but his power was already beginning to wane.

Cola di Rienzo's character has been described as a combination of knowledge, eloquence, and enthusiasm for ideal excellence, with vanity, inexperience of mankind, unsteadiness, and physical timidity. As these latter qualities became conspicuous, they eclipsed his virtues and caused his benefits to be forgotten. His extravagant pretensions only served to excite ridicule. His government was costly, and to meet its many expenses he was obliged to lay heavy taxes upon the people. He offended the Pope by his arrogance and pride, and both the Pope and Emperor by his proposal to set up a new Roman Empire, the sovereignty of which would rest directly upon the will of the people. In October, Clement gave power to a legate to depose him and bring him to trial, and the end was obviously in sight.

Taking heart, the exiled barons gathered together some troops, and war began in the neighbourhood of Rome. Cola di Rienzo obtained aid from Louis of Hungary and others, and on 20 November his forces defeated the nobles in the Battle of Porta San Lorenzo, just outside the Porta Tiburtina, a battle in which the tribune himself took no part, but in which his most distinguished foe, Stefano Colonna, was killed.

But this victory did not save him. He passed his time in feasts and pageants, while in a bull the Pope denounced him as a criminal, a pagan and a heretic, until, terrified by a slight disturbance on 15 December, he abdicated his government and fled from Rome. He sought refuge in Naples, but soon he left that city and spent over two years in an Italian mountain monastery.

=== Life in captivity ===
Emerging from his solitude, Cola journeyed to Prague in July 1350, throwing himself upon the protection of Emperor Charles IV. Denouncing the temporal power of the pope, he implored the Emperor to deliver Italy, and especially Rome, from their oppressors; but, heedless of his invitations, Charles kept him in prison for more than a year in the fortress of Raudnitz, and then handed him over to Pope Clement.

At Avignon, where he appeared in August 1352, Cola was tried by three cardinals and was sentenced to death, but this judgment was not carried out, and he remained in prison in spite of appeals from Petrarch for his release.

In December 1352, Clement died, and his successor, Pope Innocent VI, anxious to strike a blow at the baronial rulers of Rome and seeing in the former tribune an excellent tool for this purpose, pardoned and released Cola.

=== Senator of Rome and death ===
The Pope then sent Cola to Italy with the legate, Cardinal Albornoz, and gave him the title of senator. Having collected a few mercenary troops on the way, Cola entered Rome in August 1354, where he was received with great rejoicing and quickly regained his former position of power.

But this latter term of office was destined to be even shorter than his former one. Having vainly besieged the fortress of Palestrina, he returned to Rome, where he treacherously seized the soldier of fortune Giovanni Moriale, who was put to death, and where, by other cruel and arbitrary deeds, he soon lost the favour of the people. Their passions were quickly aroused, and a tumult broke out on 8 October. Cola attempted to address them, but the building in which he stood was set on fire, and while trying to escape in disguise he was murdered by the mob.

== Legacy ==
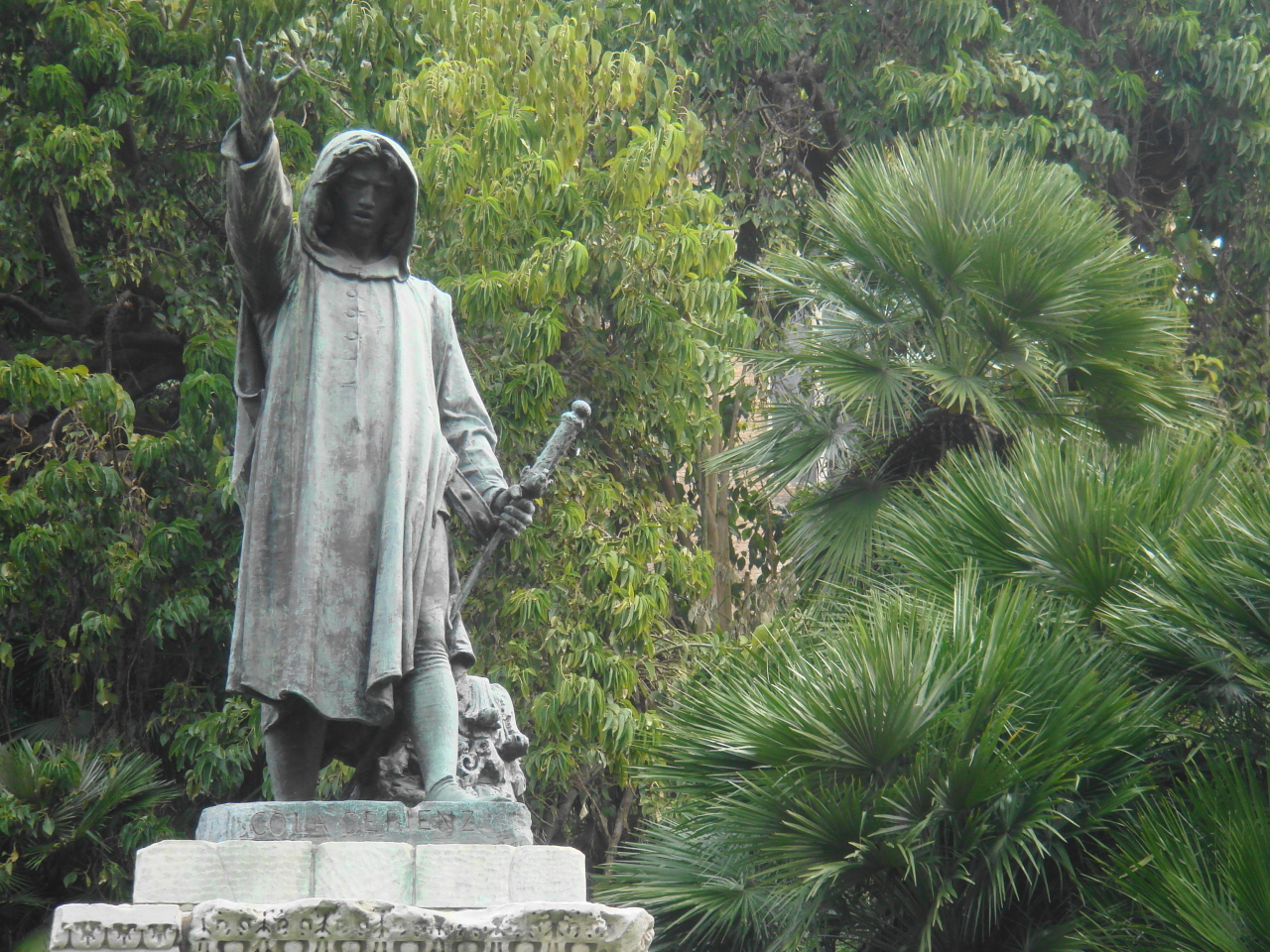
Monument to Cola di Rienzo next to the Campidoglio steps in Rome

During the 14th century, Cola di Rienzo was the hero of one of the finest of Petrarch's odes, the Spirito gentil.

Having advocated both the abolition of the Pope's temporal power and the Unification of Italy, Cola re-emerged in the 19th century, transformed into a romantic figure among politically liberal nationalists and adopted as a precursor of the 19th century Risorgimento, which struggled for and eventually achieved both aims. In this process he was reimagined as "the romantic stereotype of the inspired dreamer who foresees the national future" as Adrian Lyttleton expressed it, illustrating his point with Federico Faruffini's Cola di Rienzo Contemplating the Ruins of Rome (1855) of which he remarks, "The language of martyrdom could be freed from its religious context and used against the Church."

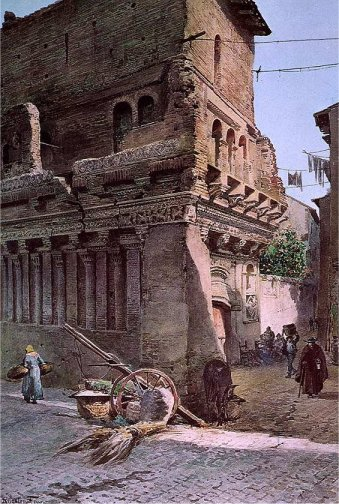
The so-called Casa di Rienzi still in its urban context before the opening of the Via del Mare in a watercolour by Ettore Roesler Franz (about 1880).

Ironically one of Rienzo's descendants, Gioacchino Vincenzo Raffaele Luigi Pecci, went on to become Pope Leo XIII.

Cola di Rienzo's life and fate have formed the subject of a novel Rienzi by Edward Bulwer-Lytton (1835), tragic plays by Gustave Drouineau (1826), Mary Russell Mitford (1828), Julius Mosen (1837), and Friedrich Engels (1841), and also of some verses of Childe Harold's Pilgrimage (1818) by Lord Byron.

Richard Wagner's first successful opera, Rienzi (Dresden, 1842), based on Bulwer-Lytton's novel, took Cola for a central figure, and at the same time, unaware of the Dresden production, Giuseppe Verdi, an ardent and anti-clerical patriot of the Risorgimento, contemplated a Cola di Rienzo.

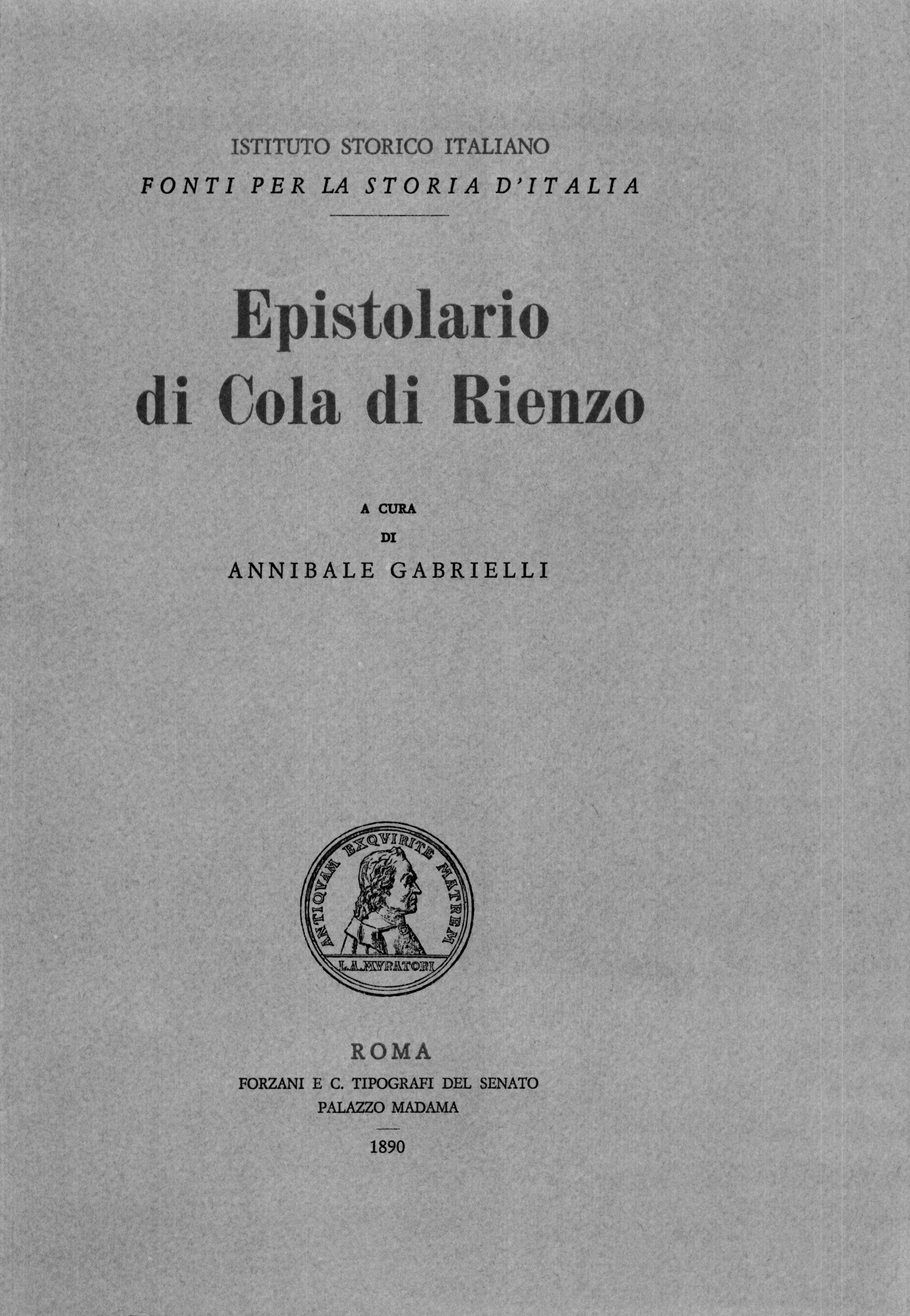
Epistolario di Cola di Rienzo

In 1873 – only three years after the new Kingdom of Italy wrested the city of Rome from papal forces – the rione Prati was laid out, with the new quarter's main street being "Via Cola di Rienzo" and a conspicuous square, Piazza Cola di Rienzo. Pointedly, the name was bestowed precisely on the street connecting the Tiber with the Vatican – at the time, headquarters of a Catholic Church still far from reconciled to the loss of its temporal power. To further drive home the point, the Piazza del Risorgimento was located at the Via Cola di Rienzo's western end, directly touching upon the Church's headquarters.

In 1877 a statue of the tribune by Girolamo Masini was erected at the foot of Rome's Capitoline Hill. In Rome, in rione Ripa, near the Bocca della Verità there still exists a brick-decorated house of the Middle Ages, distinguished by the appellation of "The House of Pilate", but also traditionally known as Cola di Rienzo's house (in fact it belonged to the patrician Crescenzi family).

Irish poet and playwright John Todhunter wrote a drama in 1881 entitled The True Tragedy Of Rienzi Tribune Of Rome. Shakespearean in style, it is largely historically accurate. Plays about Cola di Rienzo were also written by Polish late 19th century authors Adam Asnyk and Stefan Żeromski, who drew similarities between Rienzo's uprising and the Polish struggle for independence.

His letters, edited by A. Gabrielli, were published in vol. vi. of the Fonti per la storia d’Italia (Rome, 1890).

According to August Kubizek, a childhood friend of Adolf Hitler's, it was at a performance of Wagner's opera Rienzi that Hitler, as a teenager, had his first ecstatic vision of the reunification of the German people.

For his demagogic rhetoric, popular appeal and anti-establishment (as nobility) sentiment, some sources consider him an earlier populist and a proto-fascist figure.

== See also ==
- Popular revolt in late medieval Europe
