= Sciarra Colonna =

Italian aristocrat (1270-1329)

Giacomo Sciarra Colonna
- Prince of Palestrina
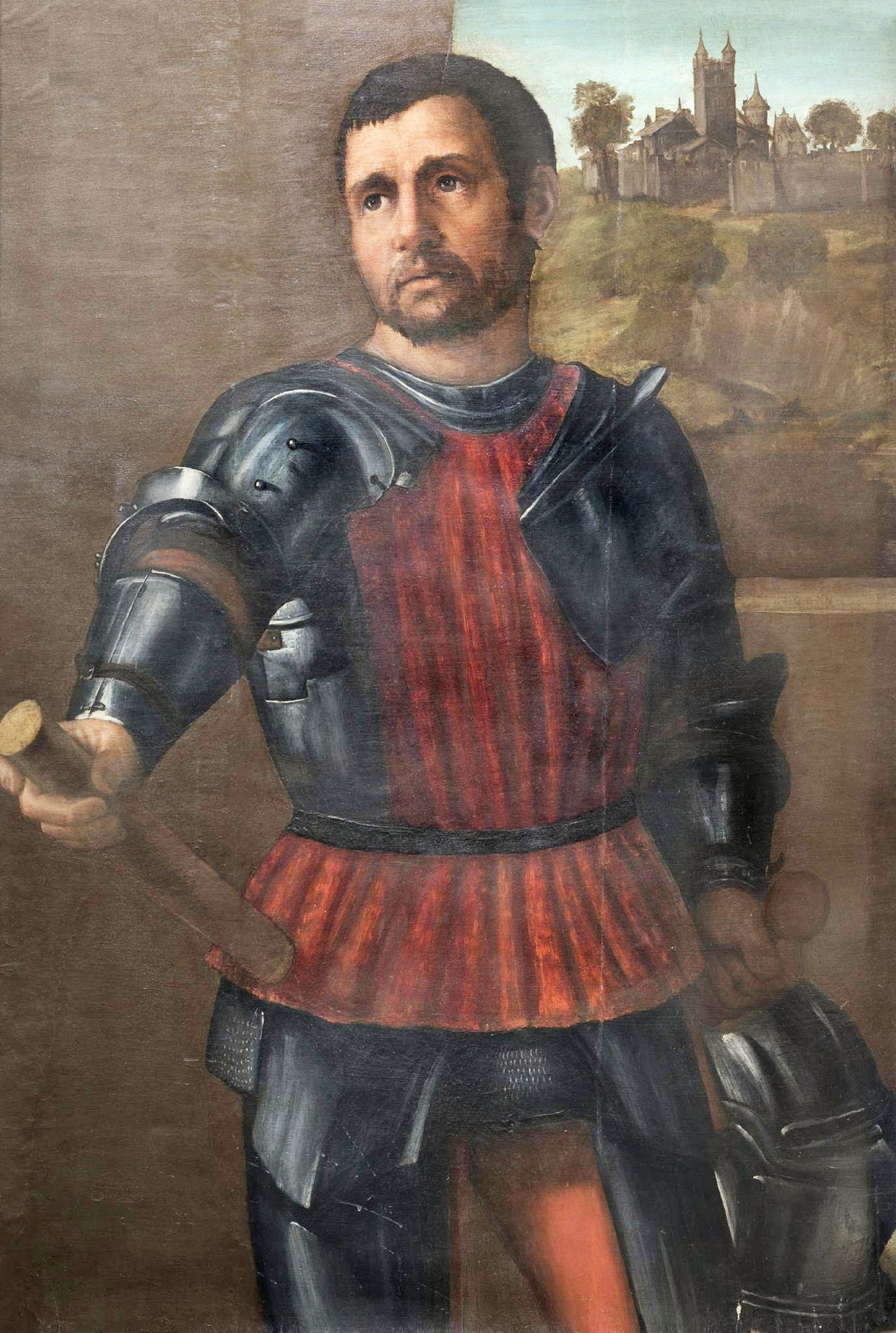
- Predecessor: None
- Successor: None
- Born: c. 1270
- Died: 1329
- Father: Giovanni Colonna, Marquis of Ancona

Giacomo Colonna, Prince of Palestrina (c. 1270-1329), more commonly known by his bynames Sciarrillo or Sciarra, was a member of the powerful Colonna family. He is most famous for attacking Pope Boniface VIII and for crowning Louis IV of Germany as Holy Roman Emperor.

== Feud between the Colonna and Pope Boniface VIII ==
The Colonna were a powerful family in papal Rome and constant - but unsuccessful - contenders in papal elections. The stalemate between the Colonna and the Orsini led to the election of Pope Celestine V, who quickly abdicated, and then Pope Boniface VIII in 1294. The new pope, who hailed from the relatively obscure Caetani family, looked for opportunities to enlarge his family's power base, and found one in a dispute among the Colonna family: when Cardinal Giacomo Colonna - Sciarra's uncle - disinherited his brothers Ottone, Matteo, and Landolfo in 1297, the three appealed to the Pope, who ordered Giacomo to return the land, and furthermore hand over the family strongholds Palestrina and other towns to the Papacy. When Giacomo refused, Boniface removed him from the College of Cardinals and excommunicated him and his followers. In turn, the Colonna disputed the legitimacy of Boniface's election and declared Celestine the rightful pope. Eventually, Palestrina was stormed by papal forces.

== Outrage of Anagni ==
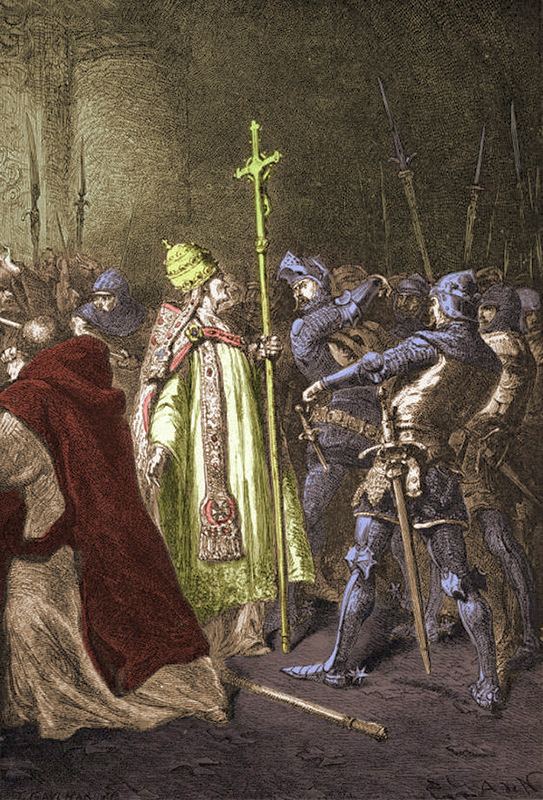
Sciarra Colonna slapping Boniface VIII, illustration by Alphonse-Marie-Adolphe de Neuville, from François Guizot's The History of France from the Earliest Times to the Year 1789 (1883).

The Colonna allied with the Pope's other great enemy, Philip IV of France. In September 1303, Sciarra and Philip's advisor, Guillaume de Nogaret, led a small force into Anagni to arrest Boniface VIII and bring him to France, where he was to stand trial. While the two managed to apprehend the Pope, Sciarra reportedly slapped the pope in the face in the process, which was accordingly dubbed the "Outrage of Anagni". The attempt eventually failed after a few days, when locals freed the Pope. However, Boniface VIII died on 11 October, allowing France to dominate his weaker successors during the Avignon papacy.

== Later years ==
The Colonna remained powerful in the papal states, especially during successive popes' absence. In 1328, Louis IV of Germany marched into Italy for his coronation as Holy Roman Emperor. As Pope John XXII was residing in Avignon and had publicly declared that he would not crown Louis, the King decided to be crowned by a member of the Roman aristocracy, who proposed Sciarra Colonna. In honor of this event, the Colonna family was granted the privilege of using the imperial pointed crown on top of their coat of arms.

One year later, Sciarra Colonna died in Venice in 1329.

== Sources ==
- Fiorella Simoni Balis-Crema: "Colonna, Giacomo". In: Lexicon of the Middle Ages (LexMA). Volume 3, Artemis & Winkler, Munich / Zurich 1986, ISBN 3-7608-8903-4, Sp. 55.
- Daniel Waley: Colonna, "Giacomo, detto Sciarra". In: Alberto M. Ghisalberti (ed.): Dizionario Biografico degli Italiani (DBI). Volume 27: Collenuccio-Confortini. Istituto della Enciclopedia Italiana, Rome 1982, pp. 314–316.
