= Jacopo Colonna (sculptor) =

Italian sculptor

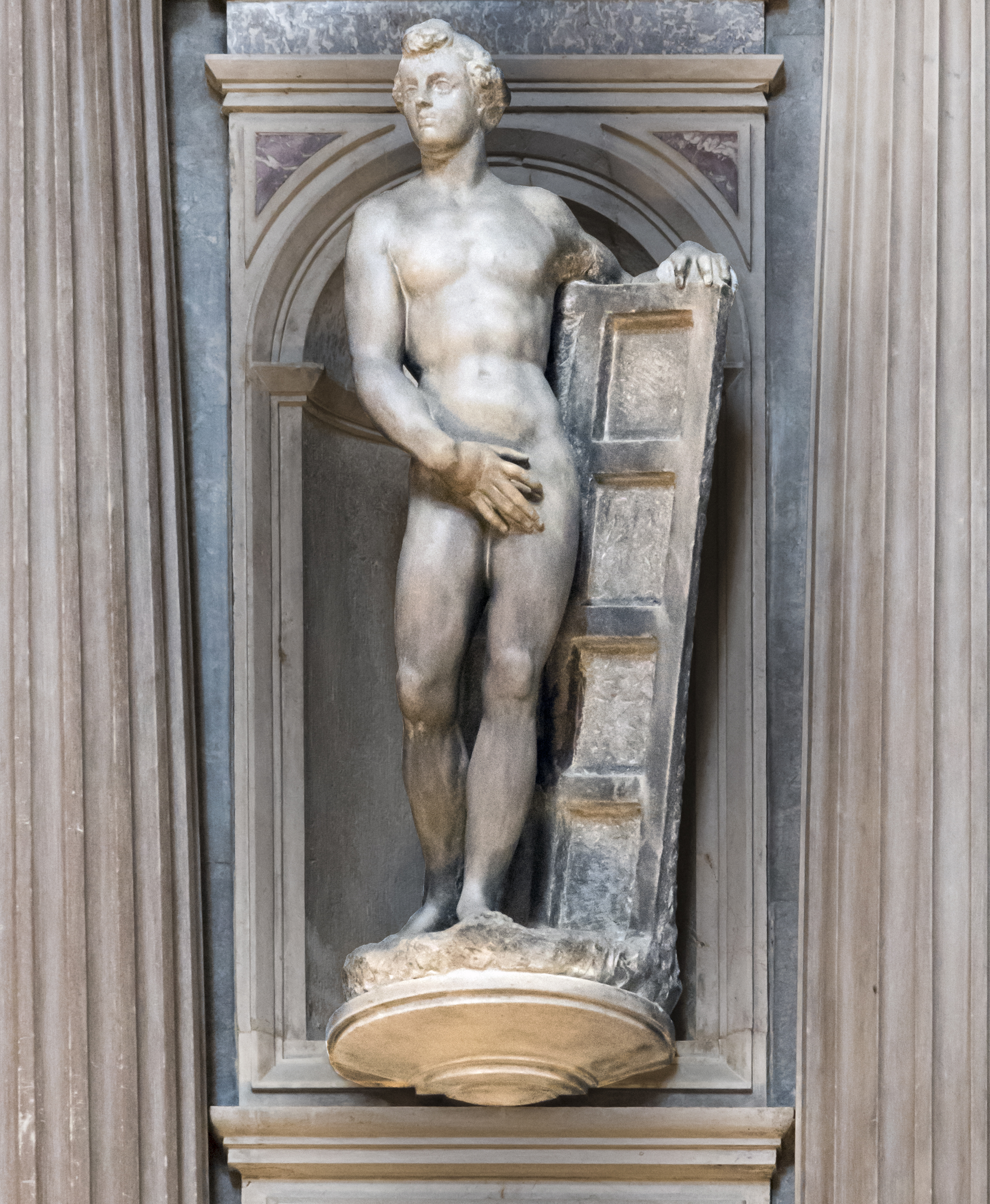
St Lawrence in San Salvador, Venice, by Jacopo

Jacopo Colonna or Giacomo Fantoni (died 1540) was an Italian sculptor active in the Renaissance.

Born in Venice, he was a pupil of Jacopo Sansovino. He completed a St Jerome statue for the church of San Salvatore, a weeping Christ now in the Gallerie dell'Accademia of Venice. In Padua he completed a St. Anthony in stucco. He was commissioned by Luigi Cornaro, stucco depictions of Minerva, Diana, and Venus, as well as a statue of Mars. He died at Bologna in 1540.

== Sources ==
- Boni, Filippo de' (1852). Biografia degli artisti ovvero dizionario della vita e delle opere dei pittori, degli scultori, degli intagliatori, dei tipografi e dei musici di ogni nazione che fiorirono da'tempi più remoti sino á nostri giorni. Seconda Edizione. Venice; Googlebooks: Presso Andrea Santini e Figlio. p. 239.
