= Crusade against the Colonna family =

The Crusade against the Colonna family was declared by Pope Boniface VIII. The targets were the two cardinals Giacomo (James) and Pietro (Peter) Colonna.

This was one of the many crusades against Christians.

== Summary ==
James Colonna was created a cardinal in 1278 by Pope Nicholas III, and Peter Colonna was appointed a cardinal in 1288 by Pope Nicholas IV. Both opposed the election of Boniface VIII following Pope Celestine V's unprecedented abdication, as they questioned the legality of that resignation. This opposition led to a significant conflict with Boniface VIII, culminating in their excommunication and removal from the College of Cardinals in 1297.
