= Piazza d'Aracoeli =

Square in Rome, Italy

- City square
- {{{other_names}}}
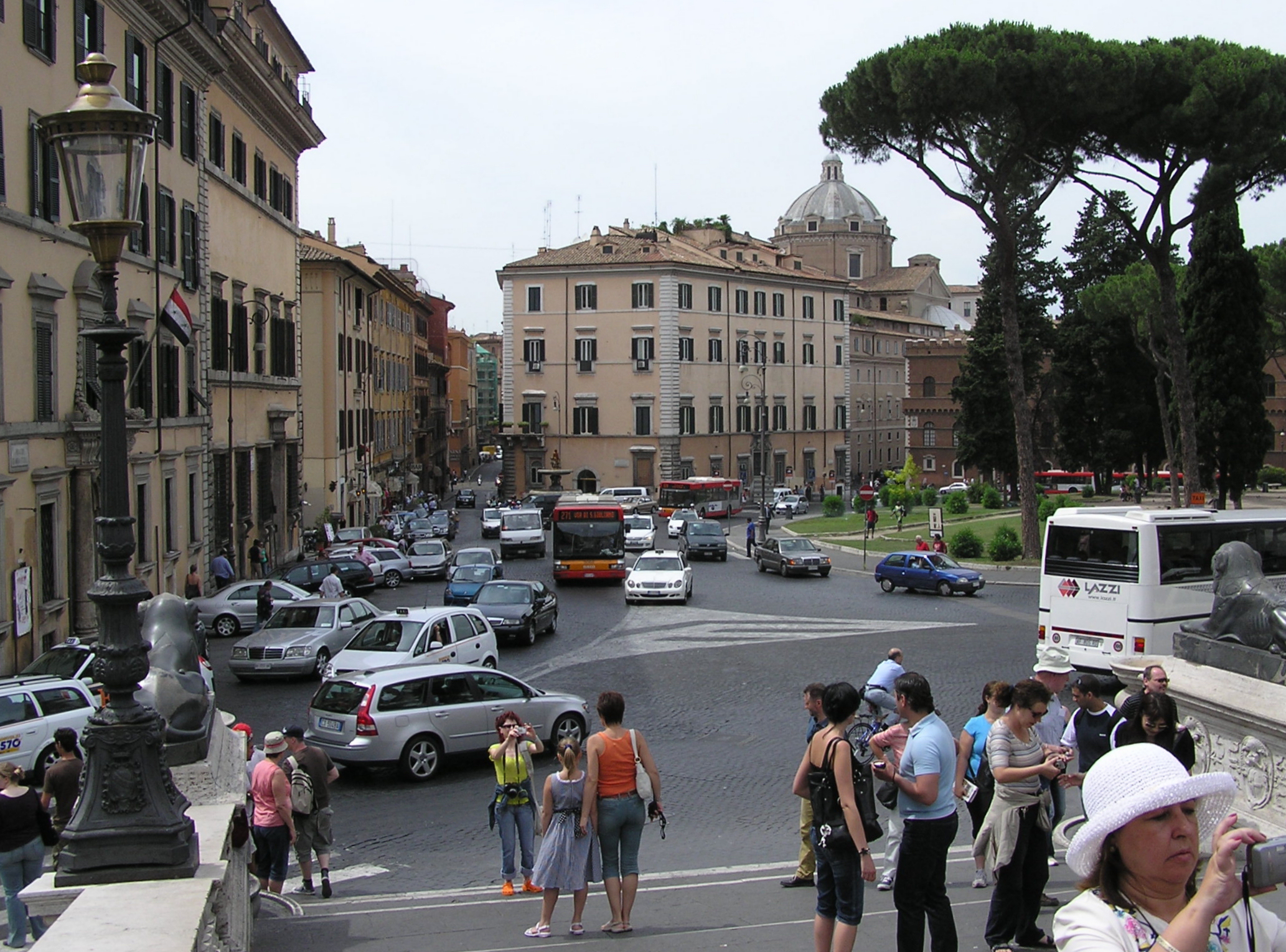
- Piazza d'Aracoeli
- Location: Rome, Italy
- Interactive map of Piazza d'Aracoeli
- Coordinates: 41°53′39.85″N 12°28′51.7″E

Piazza d'Aracoeli is a square of Rome (Italy), placed at the base of the Capitoline Hill, in the Rione X Campitelli.

== History ==
The present aspect of the square is not the cozy one it had one time: one of the sides was destroyed during the demolitions for the building of the Vittoriano, begun in 1885, and later in the 1930s the whole area of the Capitoline Hill was isolated. The square was formerly called Market Square; it was divided into two part, the Mercato (Italian: Market), at the slopes of the Capitoline Hill, and the Mercatello (Italian: Little Market), at the opposite side northward. The two toponyms recurred in the dedication of two nearby churches: San Biagio del Mercato, later called Chiesa di Santa Rita da Cascia in Campitelli, still existing but relocated elsewhere, and San Giovanni in Mercatello, later Chiesa di San Venanzio, still remembered in the toponymy. In the surroundings of the square, probably where nowadays the Palazzo Muti Bussi and the Palazzo Astalli rise, two of the many towers of the town stood: the Torre del Mercato (Italian: Tower of the Market) and the Torre del Cancelliere (Italian: Tower of the Chancellor). The market served not just as a place for commerce, but as a stage for politic debates and religious homilies as well. In 1442 the words of St. Bernardino of Siena against gambling and usury resounded. In 1551 St. Ignatius of Loyola opened his first school of grammar and Christian doctrine, from which the Collegio Romano sourced, and held his first spiritual exercises. In 1713 Rosa Venerini opened the first Roman house of the Maestre Pie Venerini, the first women's public school in Italy. The buildings in the square include the Palazzo Muti-Bussi, the Palazzo Fani (now Pecci-Blunt ) and the Palazzo Massimo di Rignano, then Colonna, while the central feature is the fountain designed by Giacomo della Porta and realized in 1589 by Andrea Brasca, Pietro Gucci and Pace Naldini. The complicated demolitions Piazza d'Aracoeli has been subjected to, if on one hand have ruined the scenic design that Michelangelo used for the adjustment of the Capitoline Hill, on the other hand have opened a striking view on an outstanding urban landscape: from it is it possible to admire with a single glance the Quirinal Hill, the Trajan's Forum with its column and the Torre delle Milizie at the back, the two churches of Santa Maria di Loreto and of the Santissimo Nome di Maria, Palazzo Venezia and the buildings of the "Angelicum" cloister.

== The palaces ==
=== Palazzo Muti-Bussi ===
The palace – in possession of the family Muti-Bussi, lately become extinct with the dead of Marchioness Olimpia – was built by Giacomo della Porta about in 1585. It has a pentagonal structure but, because of the blunt tip, where the main entrance is, it has six façades. The big front door of the main entrance is decorated with a scroll bearing the saltire mauls of the Mutis coat of arms and lion heads. At the first floor, over the entrance door, is a balcony with a beautiful view over Piazza d'Aracoeli and the majestic staircase and relevant façade of the church with the same name. Recent archeological investigations located ancient Roman walls in the cellars of the palace.

=== Palazzo Fani (now Pecci-Blunt) ===
The three-floors palace overlooks Piazza d’Aracoeli. Simple and noble, it is decorated by a frieze with floral decoration running under the ledge. In the second half of 16th century Mario Fani, noble Roman citizen hailing from Tuscania, commissioned to Giacomo della Porta the renewal of the palace. At the end of 16th century, the palace was rented out to primates (in 1601 Cardinal Federico Borromeo lived here). In the first half of 17th century the palace was bought by Filippo Spada and the sold to the Ruspoli family when they came to Rome from Siena. At the beginning of the 18th century, the palace passed to the Malatesta family and finally to the Pecci Blunt counts. The building now houses residential buildings, but is also used by the present owners, the Valsecchi Nesbitts, as a location for high-society and cultural events.

=== Palazzo Massimo di Rignano (then Colonna) ===
the present aspect of the palace is due to the architect Carlo Fontana and shows a gate with vegetal decorations, four floors, a modern attic and a crenellated tower-observatory. The left corner of the palace was cut in 1939, during the opening of Via del Teatro di Marcello.

== The fountain ==
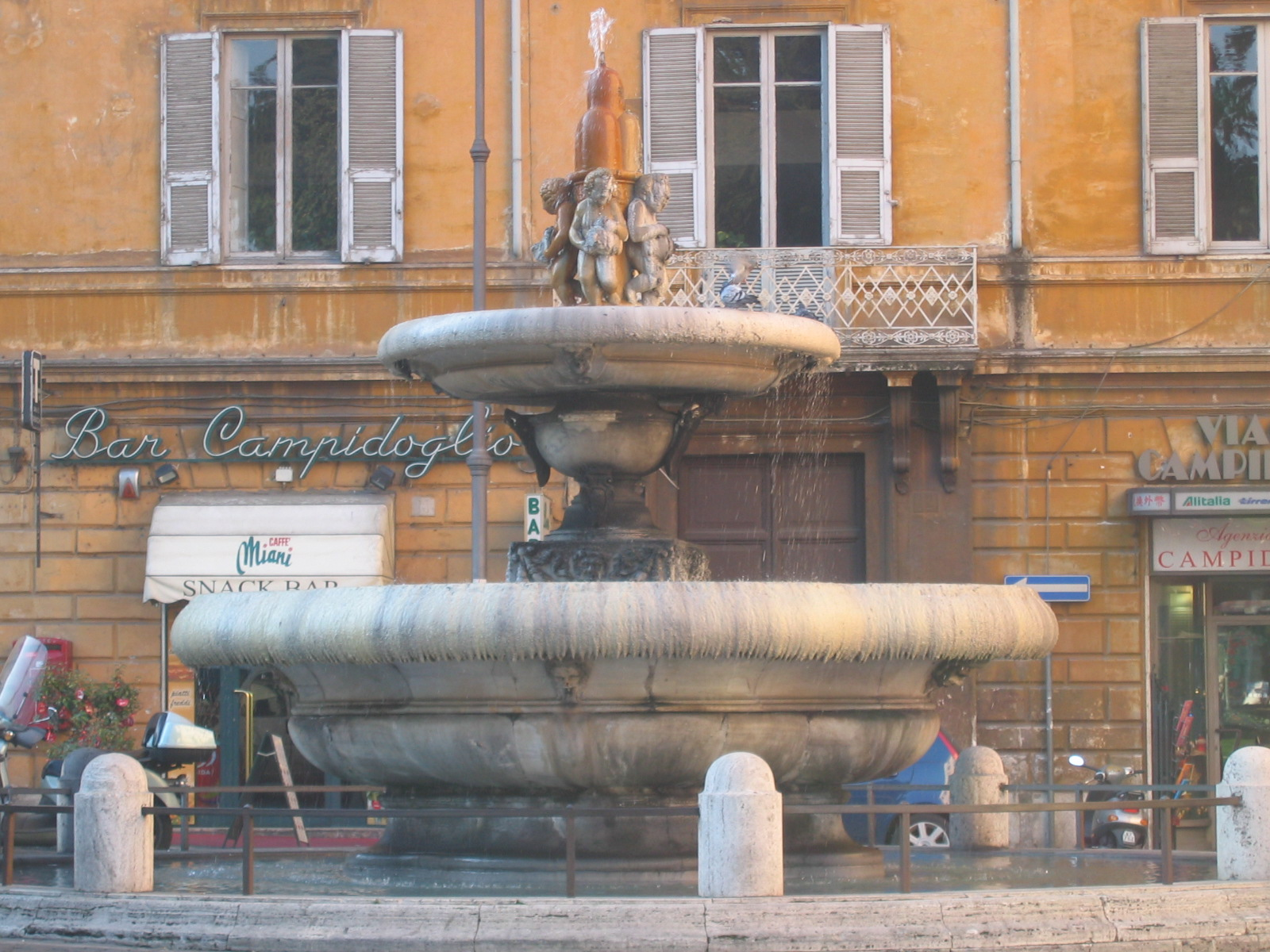
The Fountain of Aracoeli

The fountain, built in 1589 by Andrea Brasca, Pietreo Gucci and Pace Naldini on a design by Giacomo Della Porta, one time rose on two steps repeating the lines of the lower basin and was surrounded by a logline receiving the water. In 1800 the steps were removed and replaced by little columns. The fountain has two basins with different shapes; the smaller one sustains a group of putti pouring water from a vase.

== Bibliography ==
- Guida d’Italia. Roma. Milan: Touring Club Italiano. 1999
- La Grande Guida dei Rioni di Roma. Newton & Compton editori, Rome, 2000
- San Biagio in Mercatello. In “Roma Sacra. Guida alle Chiese della città eterna. 15° itinerario”. Rome: Elio De Rosa. V. 1999
- Pietrangeli, Carlo. Guide rionali di Roma. Rione X Campitelli. Rome: Fratelli Palombi editori. 1992
- Ravaglioli, Armando. Vedere e capire Roma. Rome: Rome Historic Centre. 1981.

Preceded by Piazza Colonna	Landmarks of Rome; Piazza d'Aracoeli	Succeeded by Piazza del Popolo
