= Gilbert Ray Hawes =

American lawyer and author (1854–1923)

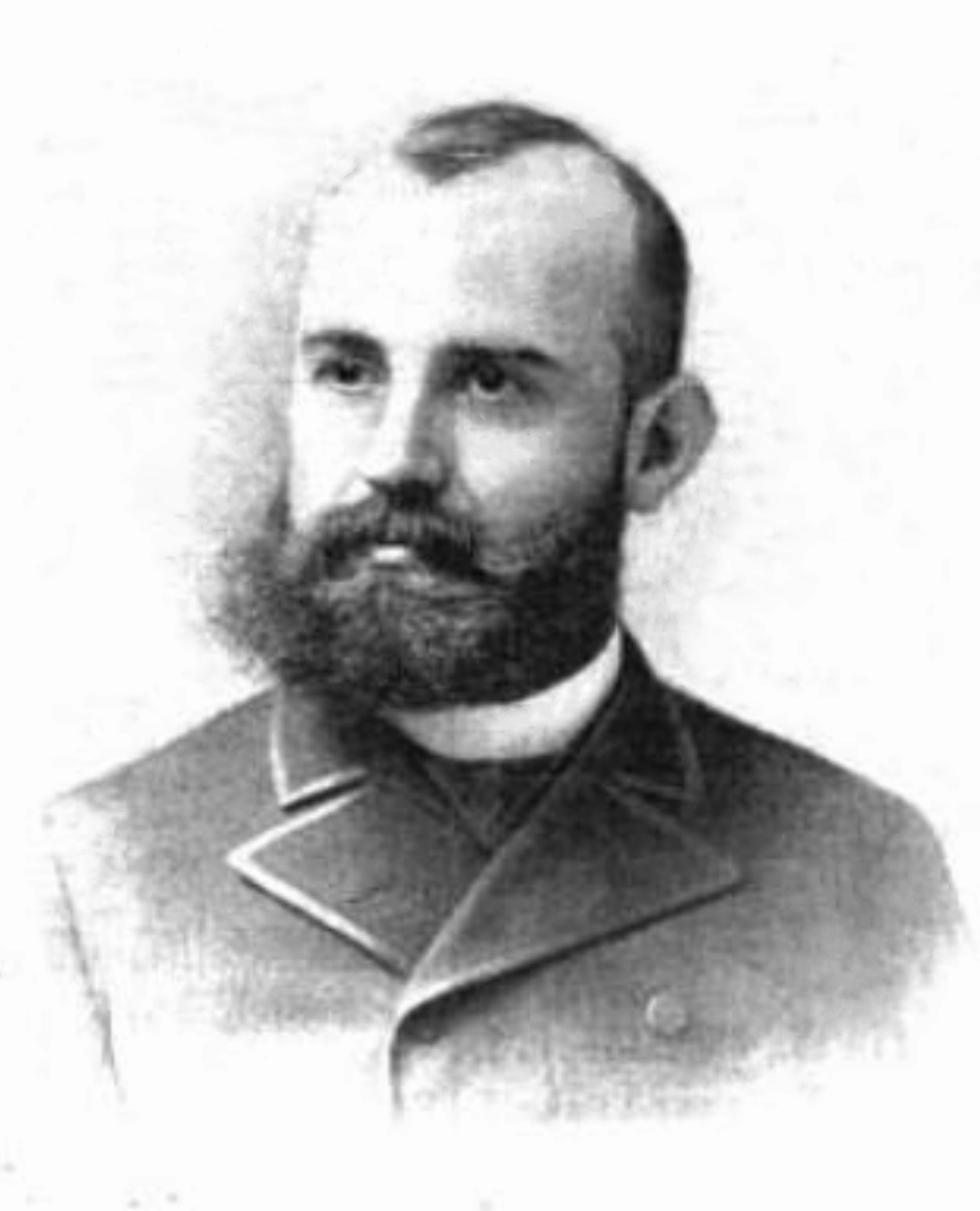
- Hawes c. 1891
- Born: December 8, 1854; Brooklyn, New York, U.S.
- Died: April 15, 1923 (aged 68); Manhattan, New York, U.S.
- Education: Amherst College (BA); Columbia Law School (LLB, MA)
- Spouse: Gertrude Newman Dunlop (m. 1903)

Gilbert Ray Hawes (December 8, 1854 – April 15, 1923) was an American lawyer and author. He practiced law from 1878 until his death in 1923, and was involved in several high-profile cases.

== Early life and education ==
The son of Peter Augustus Hawes and Mary Hawes (née Morris), Gilbert Ray Hawes was born in Brooklyn, New York, on December 8, 1854. He was a descendant of Edward Hawes, a 1635 settler of colonial Massachusetts. His father was a merchant and his grandfather was the lawyer and author William Post Hawes.

Hawes attended Columbia Grammar School. As a teenager, he arranged Franz Abt's Lark's Rejoicing for an 1872 performance at a "Peace Jubilee" in Boston in which it was performed by Minna Peschka-Leutner. He was educated at Amherst College where he graduated in 1876. He pursued further studies at Columbia Law School where he earned a Bachelor of Laws in 1878 and a Master of Arts in 1884.

== Career and later life ==
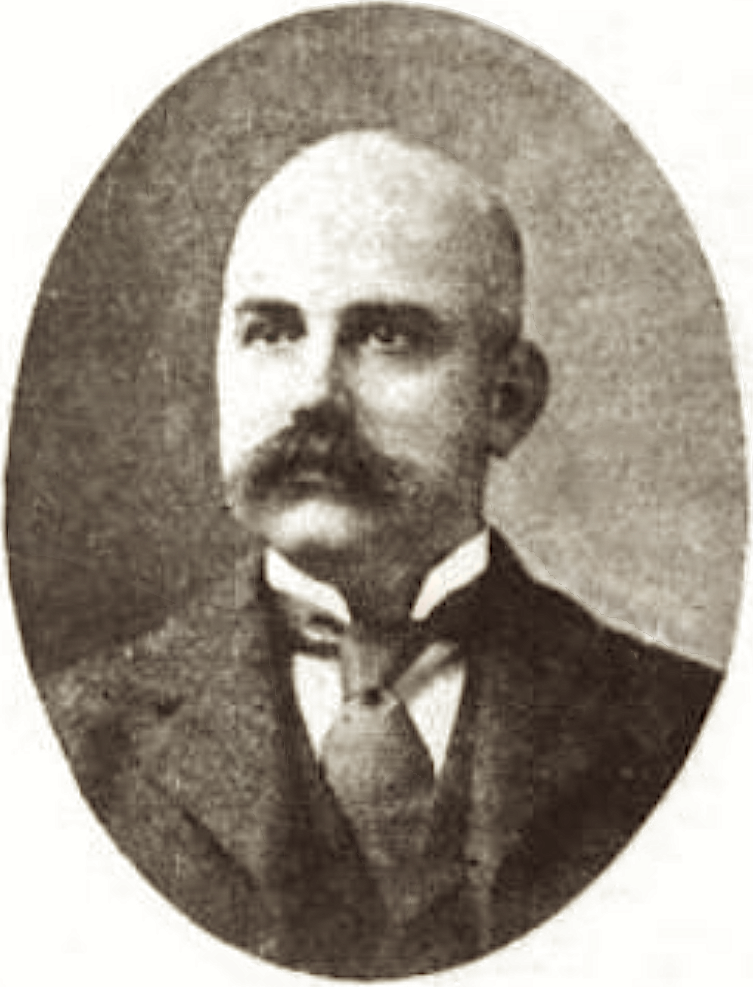
Hawes c. 1897

Hawes was a practicing lawyer in New York City from 1878 until his death in 1923. He was admitted to the New York State Bar Association in 1878. He was admitted to practice in the United States district court and the United States circuit court in 1883, and the United States Supreme Court (USSC) in 1897. In his early career he spent three years as a partner in the firm Stewart & Hawes, and then led his own practice for eighteen years before joining with lawyer Livingston Norman to form the firm Hawes & Norman. He was particularly active in corporate law and real estate law, and was instrumental in the passage of a law around the Torrens title in the state of New York.

In 1892 Hawes was involved in the high-profile Seixas Case involving the Government of Venezuela and American diplomat William Lindsay Scruggs, during which time he exposed Scruggs for paying bribes to Venezuela's president, Raimundo Andueza Palacio. On March 18, 1895, he was elected a member of the New York Genealogical and Biographical Society. He was the author of the book Edward Hawes, the Emigrant, and Some of His Descendants (1895).

In 1902 Hawes represented musical journalist and editor Marc A. Blumenberg in a high-profile case in which composer Victor Herbert sued Blumenberg for libel. Blumenberg had accused Herbert of plagiarizing classical composers like Ludwig van Beethoven in The Musical Courier, and Herbert sued him in court for $50,000.00 in damages. High-profile witnesses who defended Herbert in the court case included music critic Henry Edward Krehbiel and conductor Walter Damrosch. Herbert successfully won the amount he sued for, but the damages were later reduced to $5,000.00 on appeal.

On June 1, 1903, Hawes married Gertrude Newman Dunlop in Kansas City, Missouri. They never had children. That same year he represented the widow of composer Richard Wagner, Cosima Wagner, and their son, Siegfried Wagner, in a lawsuit against the Metropolitan Opera ("Met"). At that time Heinrich Conried was director of the Met. The case was over the copyright and performing rights to Wagner's opera Parsifal. The Met claimed that the work was not copyrighted in the United States, and therefore the company had the right to perform the opera without the Wagner family's permission. An unsuccessful appeal for an injunction was made to the USSC, and the Met ultimately won the case.

In another high-profile case, he represented the Italian sculptor Ernesto Biondi in his lawsuit against the Metropolitan Museum of Art (MMA) in 1905. The MMA's board had removed Biondi's sculpture Saturnalia from display at the museum after being appalled by the "immorality" of the subject matter which led Biondi to sue for breach of contract.

In addition to his work as a lawyer, Hawes was active as a lecturer for the board of the New York City Department of Education for a six-year period, and also lectured at the New York Law School. He gave lectures on the countries of Norway and Russia in addition to lecturing on the law. He contributed articles to several legal periodicals, and also wrote on genealogical and biographical topics. He was an active member of numerous organizations, among them the American Bar Association, Sons of the American Revolution, the New York Historical Society, the Order of the Founders and Patriots of America, and the Medico-Legal Society among others.

Hawes died at his home in the Upper West Side of Manhattan on April 15, 1923.
