= Aristodemo Costoli =

Italian sculptor (1803–1871)

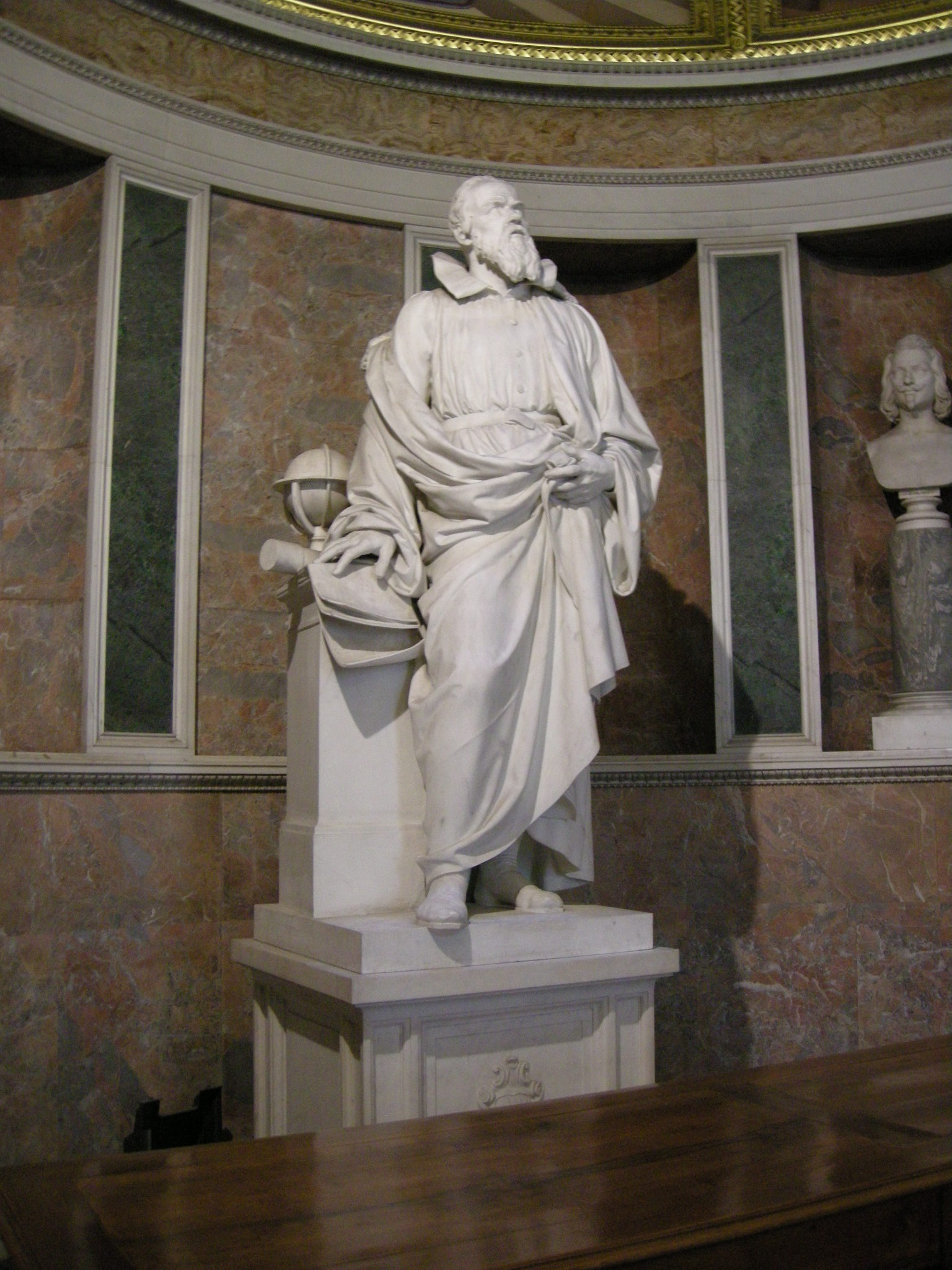
Tribuna di galileo, statua di galileo, Aristodemo Costoli.

Aristodemo Costoli (1803–1871) was an Italian sculptor who spent his entire career in the city of Florence. He is also known for attempting in 1843 to clean and conserve the famed Renaissance-era sculpture David by Michelangelo; unfortunately his hydrochloric acid cleaning solution removed the stone's waxy protective coating and left the surface pitted and porous. His students included Emilio Zocchi, Girolamo Masini, Augusto Rivalta and his son Leopoldo Costoli.

== Biography ==
=== Early life and career ===
At the age of 12 he entered the Accademia di Belle Arti e Liceo Artistico in Florence to study painting under Giuseppe Bezzuoli, Pietro Benvenuti and Pietro Ermini and sculpture under Stefano Ricci. A Self-portrait (1828; Florence, Palazzo Pitti) in oil on canvas demonstrates a Romantic style learnt from Bezzuoli and anticipates Costoli’s abilities to render portraiture in sculpture. In 1828 he won a four-year stipendium, enabling him to travel to Rome. While there he produced the over life-size gesso Menoeceus (1830; Florence, Palazzo Pitti; marble version, 1853), which was praised for its classically rendered, idealized body when exhibited at the Esposizione di Roma in 1830.

=== Maturity ===
He returned to Florence and, his reputation increasing, was appointed Assistant Master of Sculpture under Lorenzo Bartolini at the Accademia in 1839. In 1842 he executed a statue of Galileo Galilei for the city’s Museo della Specola (now the Museo Zoologico ‘La Specola’) and a second version for the exterior loggia of the Uffizi.In 1846 he sculpted a marble portrait bust of his patron Leopold II, Grand Duke of Tuscany (Lucca, National Museum of Villa Guinigi). In that year he also participated in a competition for a monument to Christopher Columbus, but the commission was given to Bartolini, who died before completing the full-size work; Costoli, Pietro Freccia (1814–56) and others finished it by 1862 (Genoa, Piazza Acquaverde), Costoli’s contribution being a figure of Prudence for the base and a low relief of Columbus Planting the Cross on the Beach. Another sculpture with this theme is the Discovery of America (1848; Florence, Palazzo Pitti), a bronze group 860 mm high on an ebony base. Its rather small dimensions and elegant decorative qualities inspired many copies.

Despite their artistic differences, in 1850 Costoli succeeded Bartolini as Professor of Sculpture at the Accademia. His last work was the monument to the singer Angelica Catalani (1867; Pisa, Camposanto Monumentale), an ambitious, multi-figured work that includes figures of Charity, St. Cecilia and an angel, as well as that of the deceased in her family’s arms. Critics admired Costoli’s flawless technique and his Neoclassical style that also bore signs of a restrained naturalism, but they faulted his sculptures for a certain coldness.

== Partial anthology of works ==
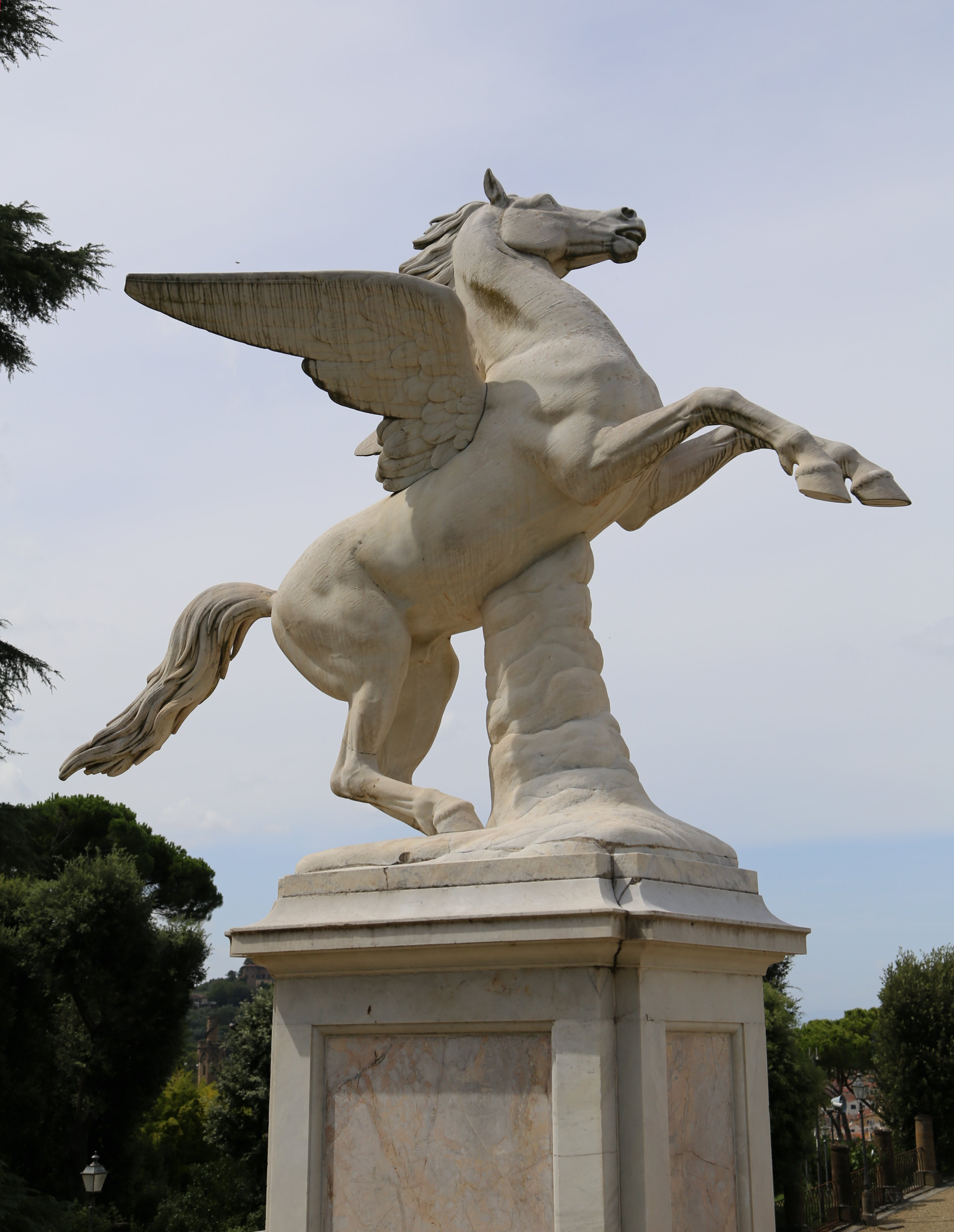
Pegasus at Boboli Garden, Florence

Florence

- Galileo in Tribune of Galileo, at Museo della Specola (1832);
- Christophe Colomb, at musée du Nouveau Monde, La Rochelle (France);
- Pegasus, in Giardino di Boboli;
- tondo dedicated to Arnolfo di Cambio in Duomo di Firenze;
- bust of Cosimo Buonarroti and Rosina Vendramin, in Casa Buonarroti;
- Monument to L. Matteucci (1845), in Badia Fiorentina;
- Discovery of America, in Hall 5 of Galleria d'arte moderna (Firenze) in Palazzo Pitti;
- Monument to Galileo, niche in the ground-floor courtyard of the Uffizi Gallery (1851);
- Jeremiah (Palazzo Pitti);
- Funeral Monument to Della Gherardesca (Santa Maria del Fiore a Lapo);
- Bas-relief of Villa Paolina (Sesto Fiorentino).

Other cities in Italy

- Genoa: Prudence and Columbus placing flag on Beach (1862), monument to Christopher Columbus.
- Ancona: Monument to Cavour (1868), with statue dedicated to Cavour and two bas-reliefs, at Cavour square.
- Pisa: Monument to Angelica Catalani (1859), at Camposanto.
- Lucca: Bust of Leopold II, Museo nazionale di villa Guinigi.

Other countries:

- Santiago, Chile: Monument to Pedro de Valdivia
- Saint Petersburg: Memorial to Ekaterina Arkadievna Kotchoubey and her daughter Vera
- France, La Rochelle, Musée du Nouveau Monde, La découverte de l'Amérique, marbre blanc, 78x40x26 cm
- Private commissions, England.
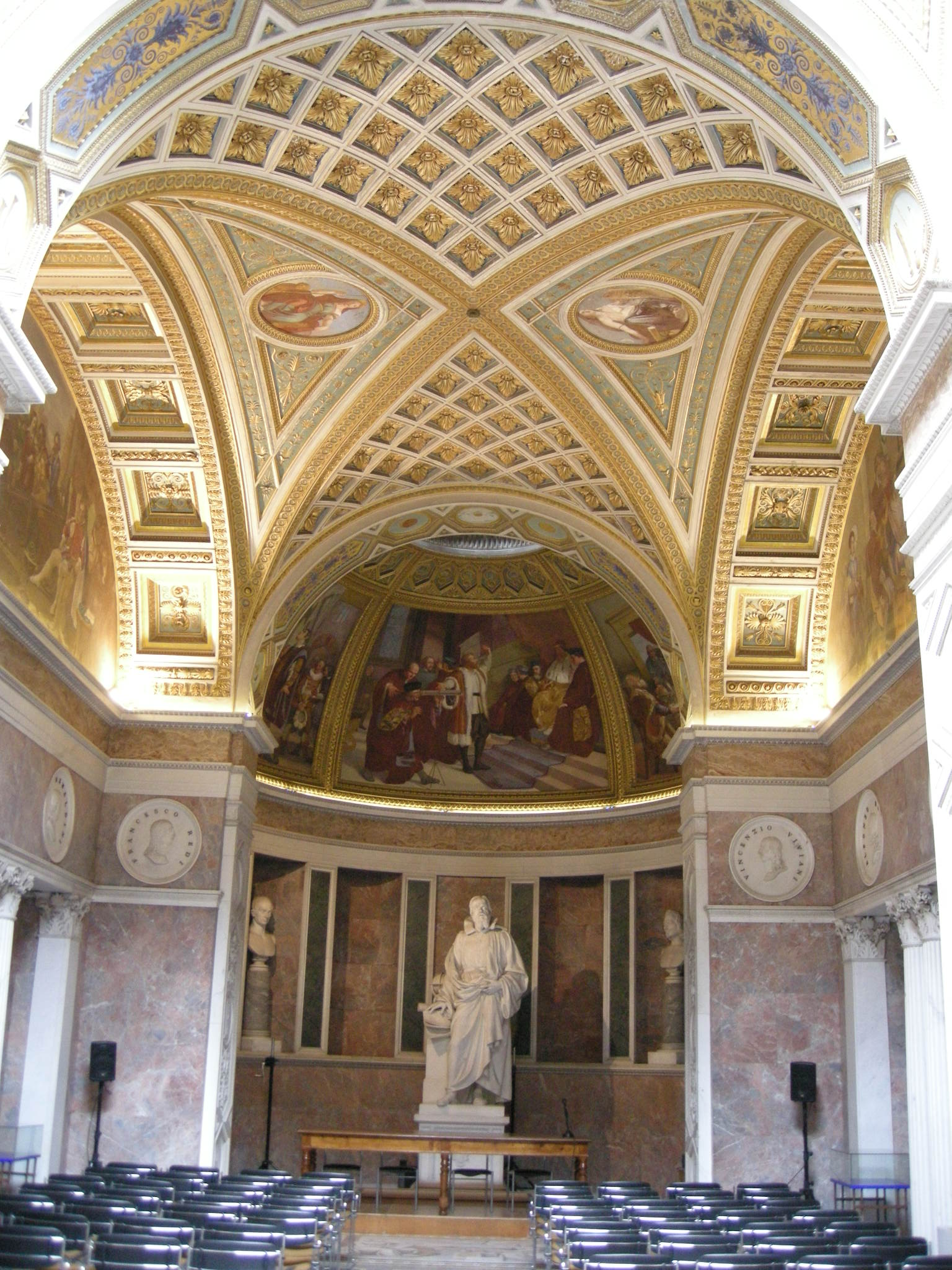
Galileo Galilei (Museo della Specola, Florence)

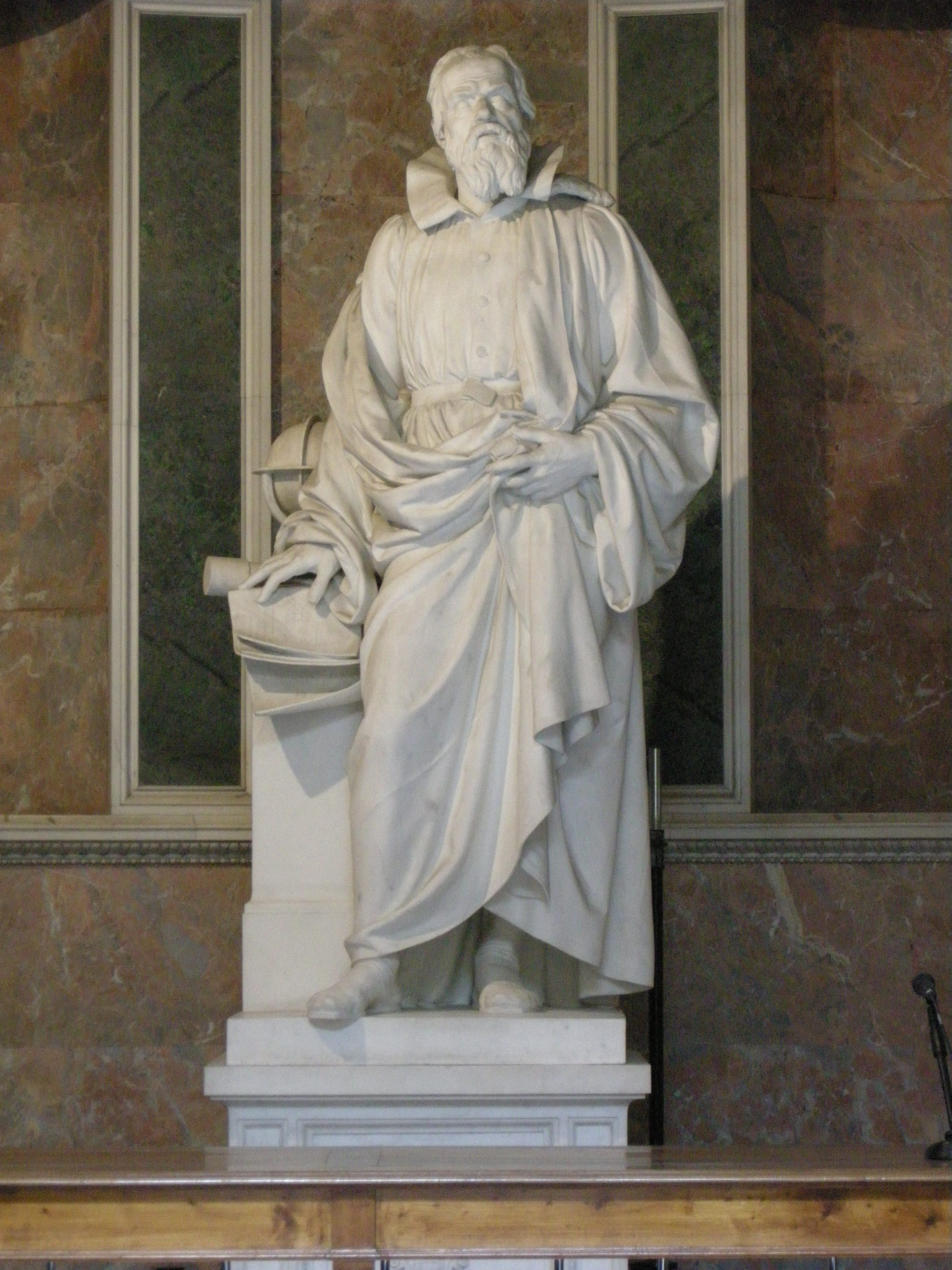
Galileo Galilei (Museo della Specola, Florence)

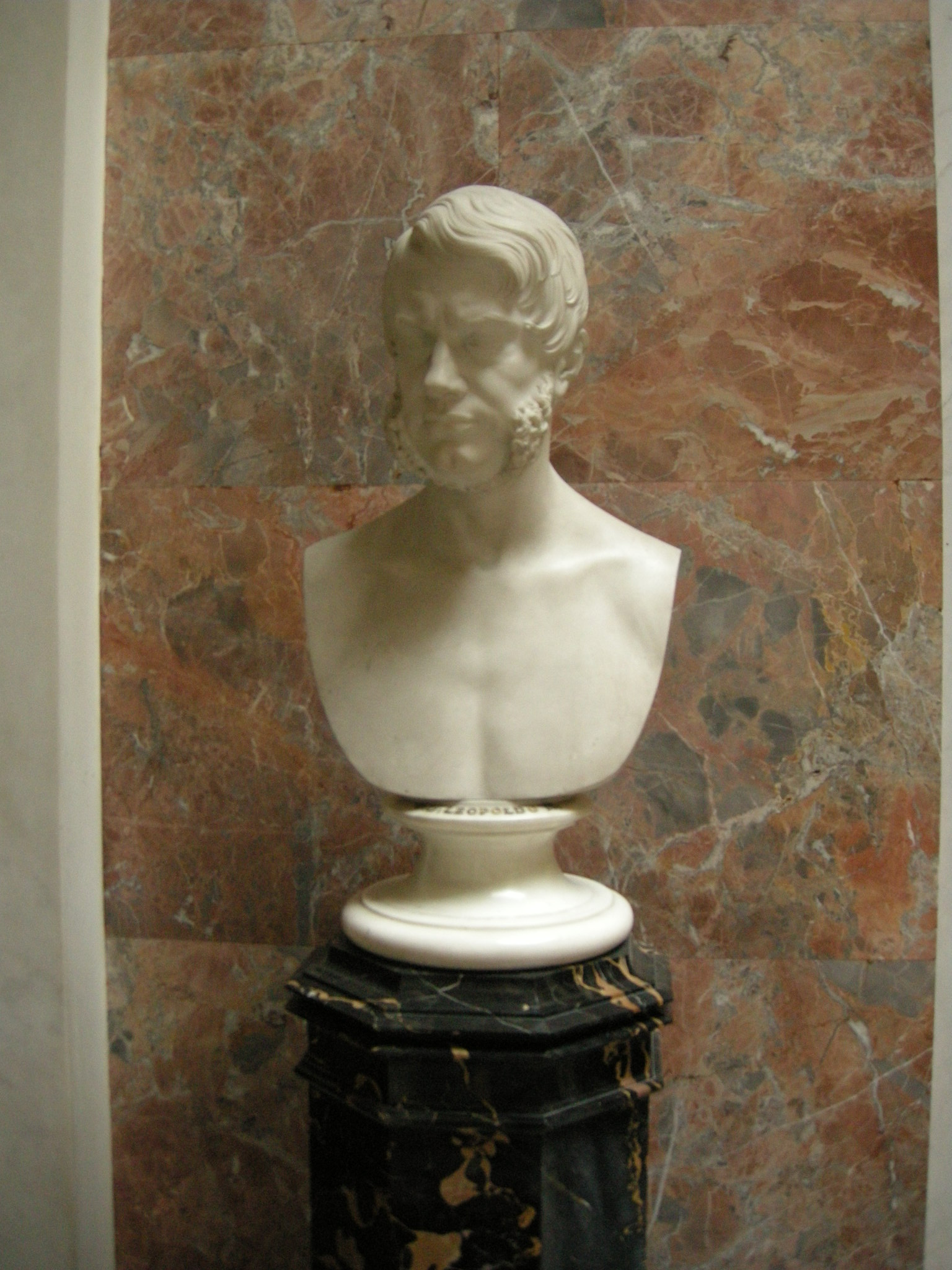
Leopold II (Museo della Specola, Florence)

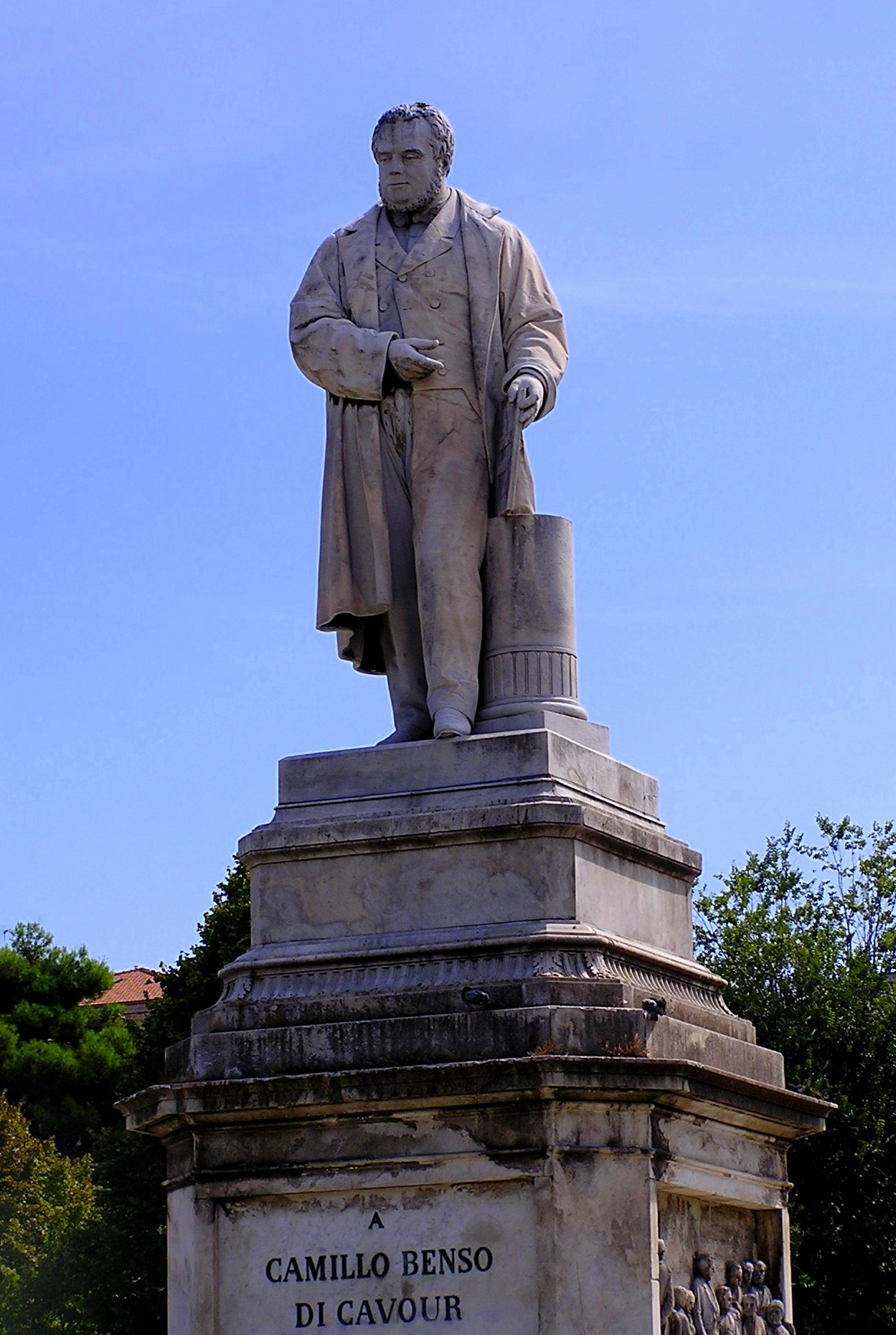
Cavour (Cavour square, Ancona)

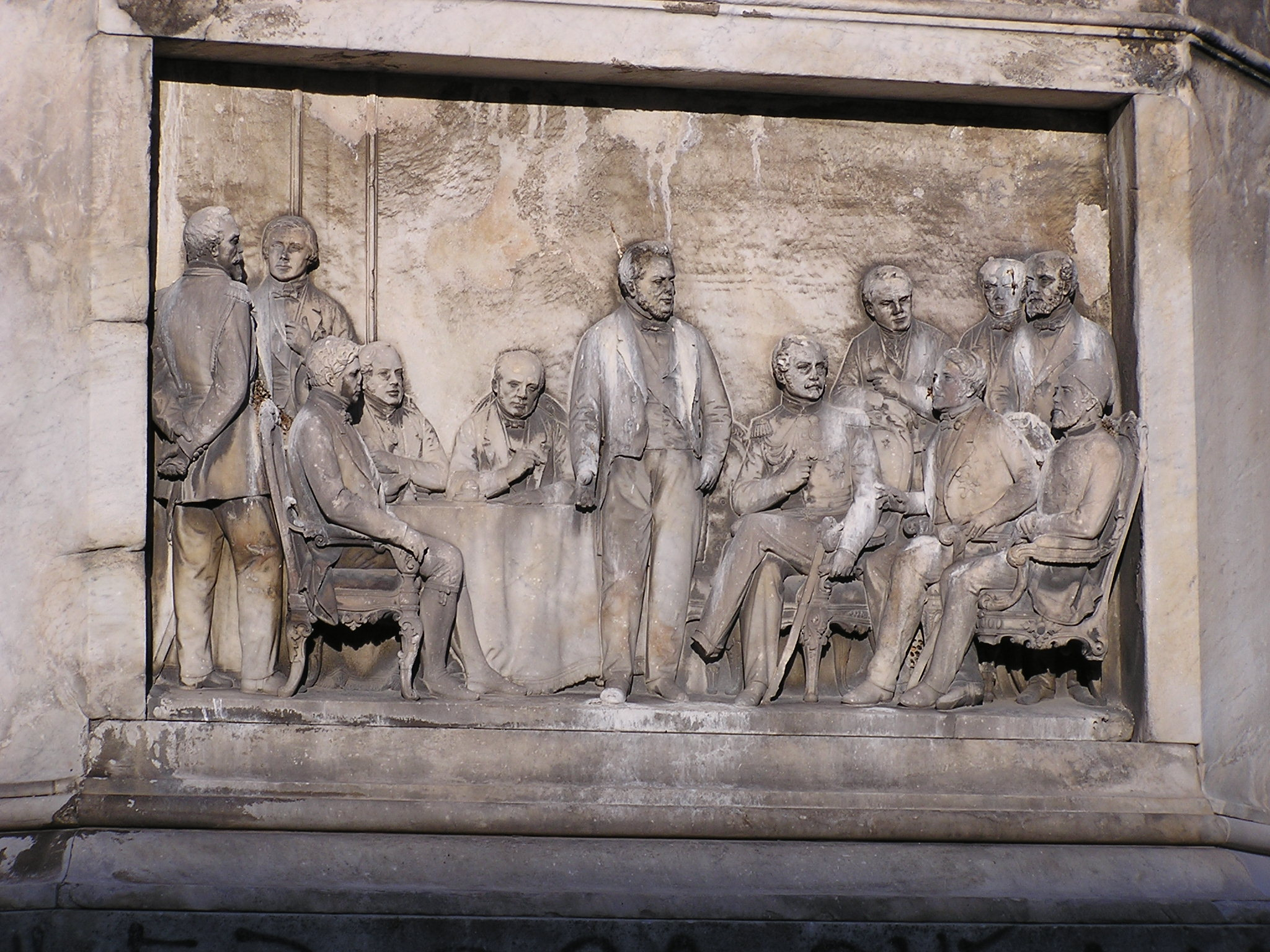
Congress of Paris (Cavour square, Ancona)

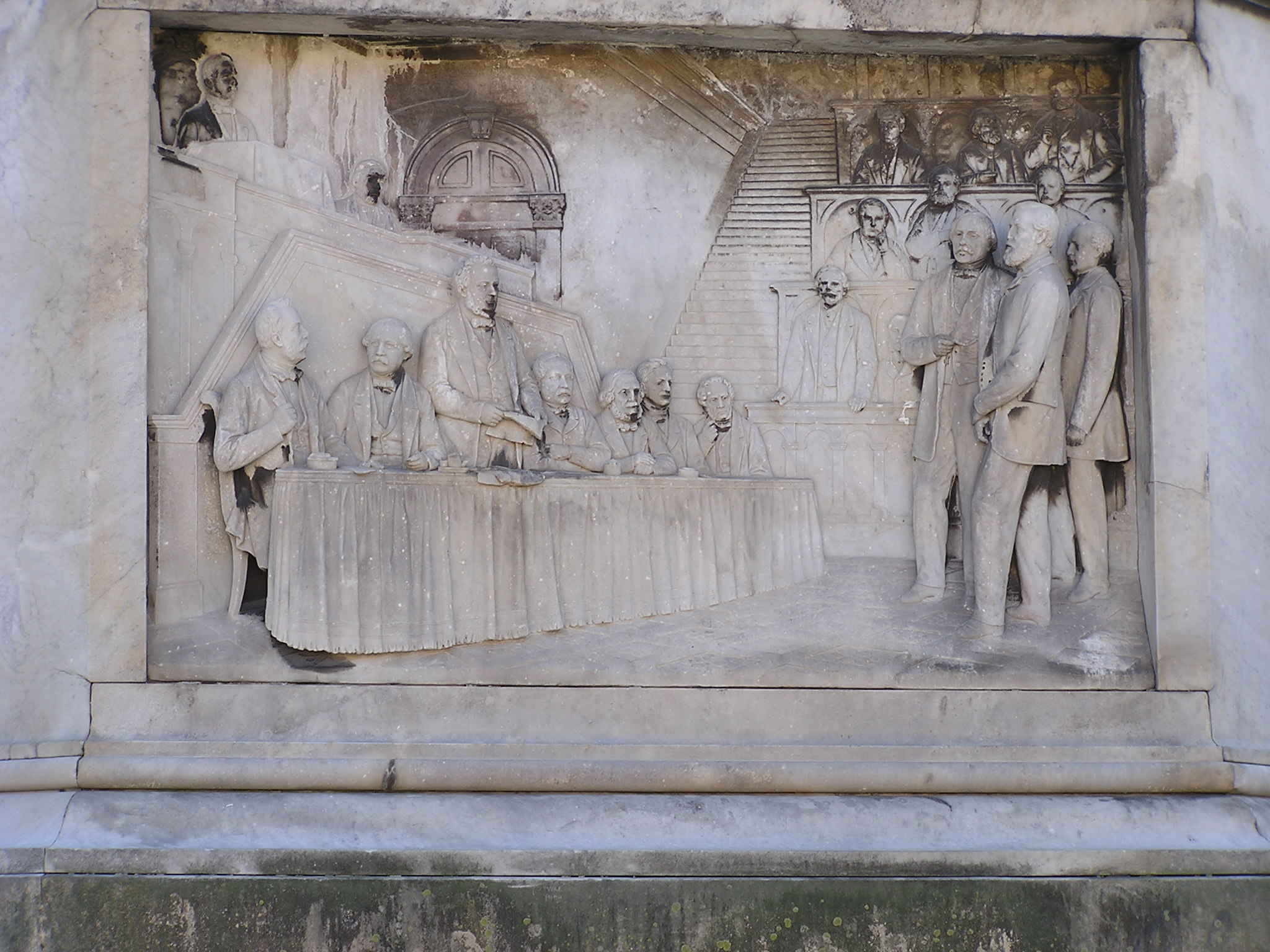
Proclamation of the Kingdom of Italy (Cavour square, Ancona)

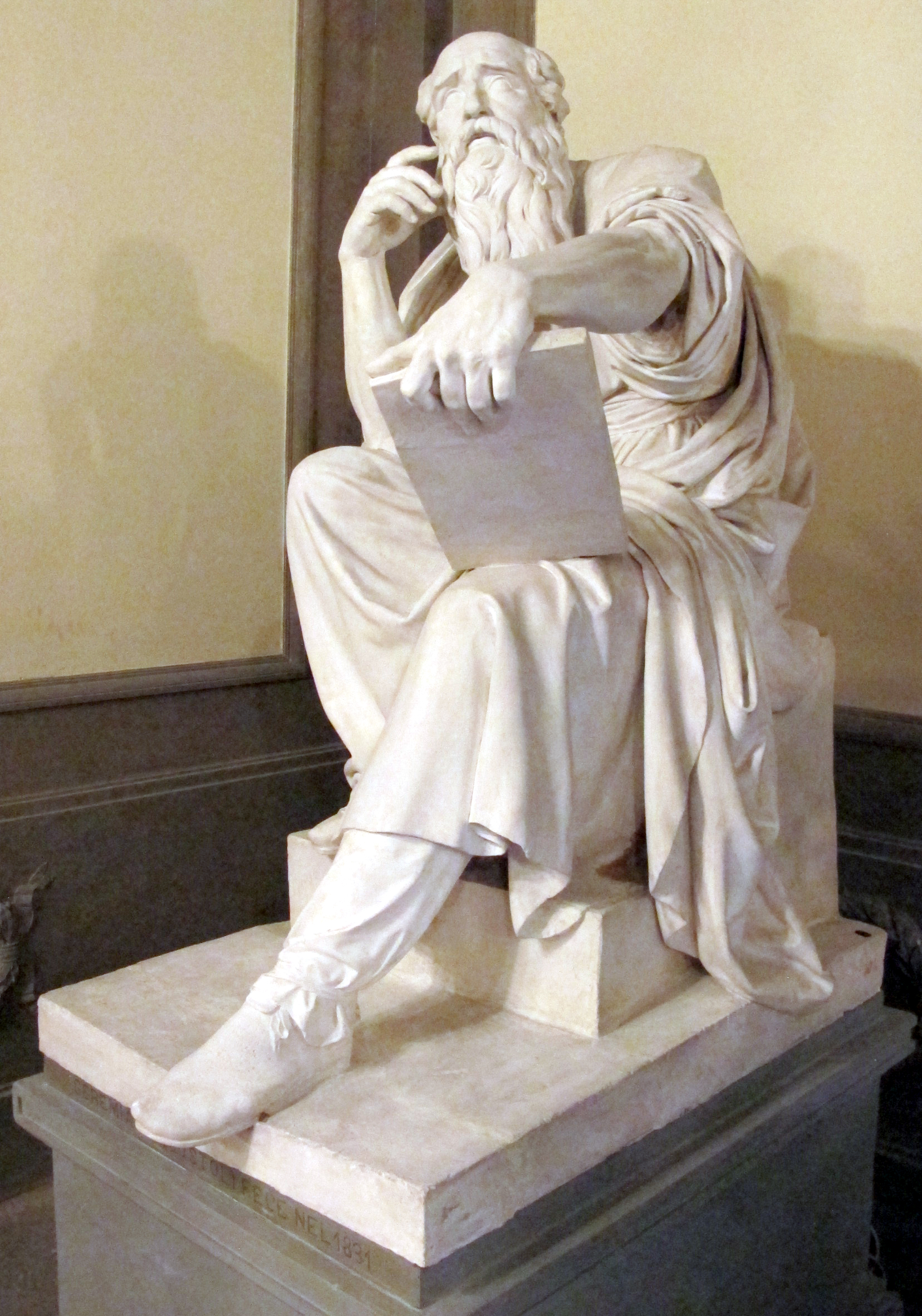
Geremia (Palazzo Pitti, Florence)

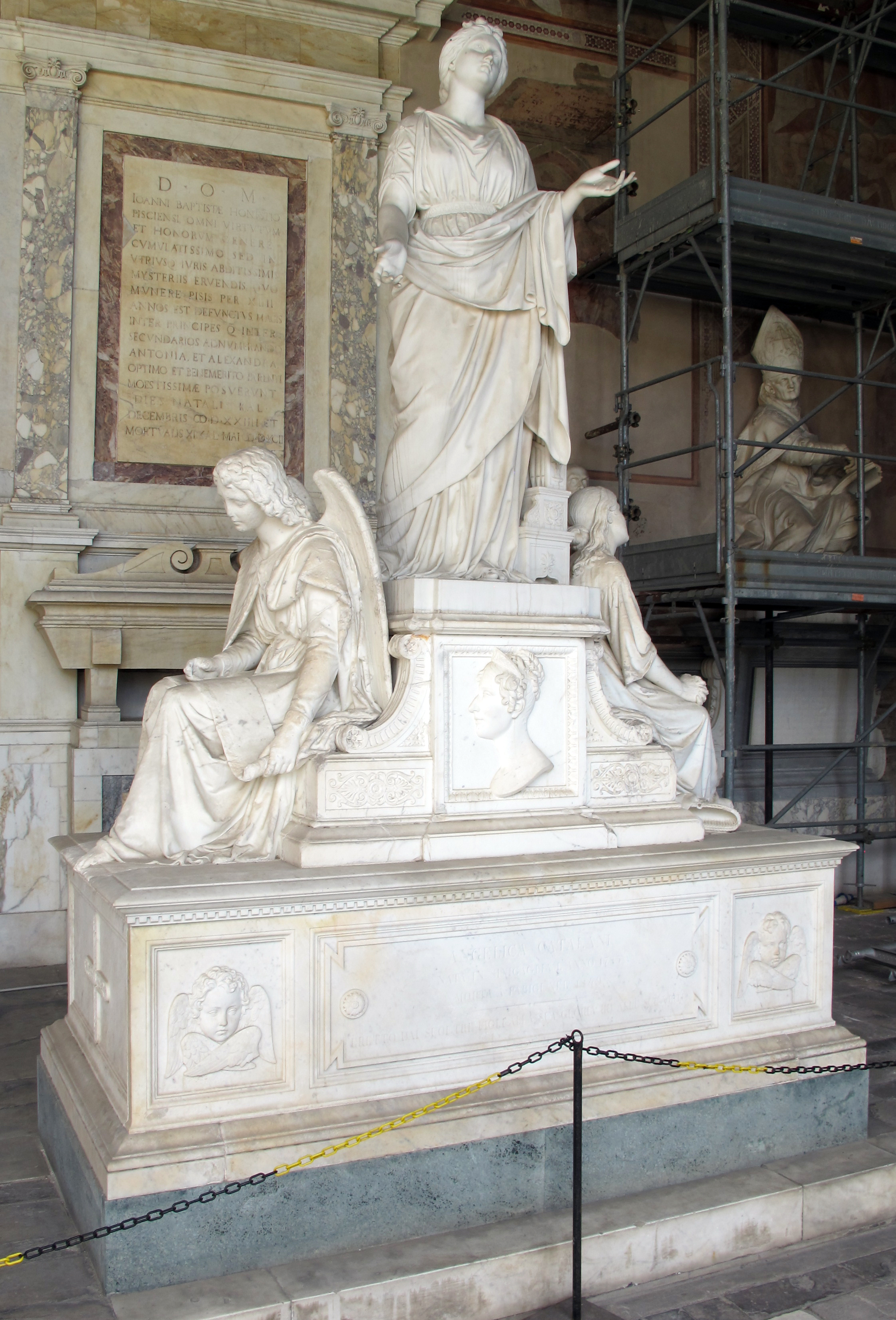
Angelica Catalani (Camposanto, Pisa)

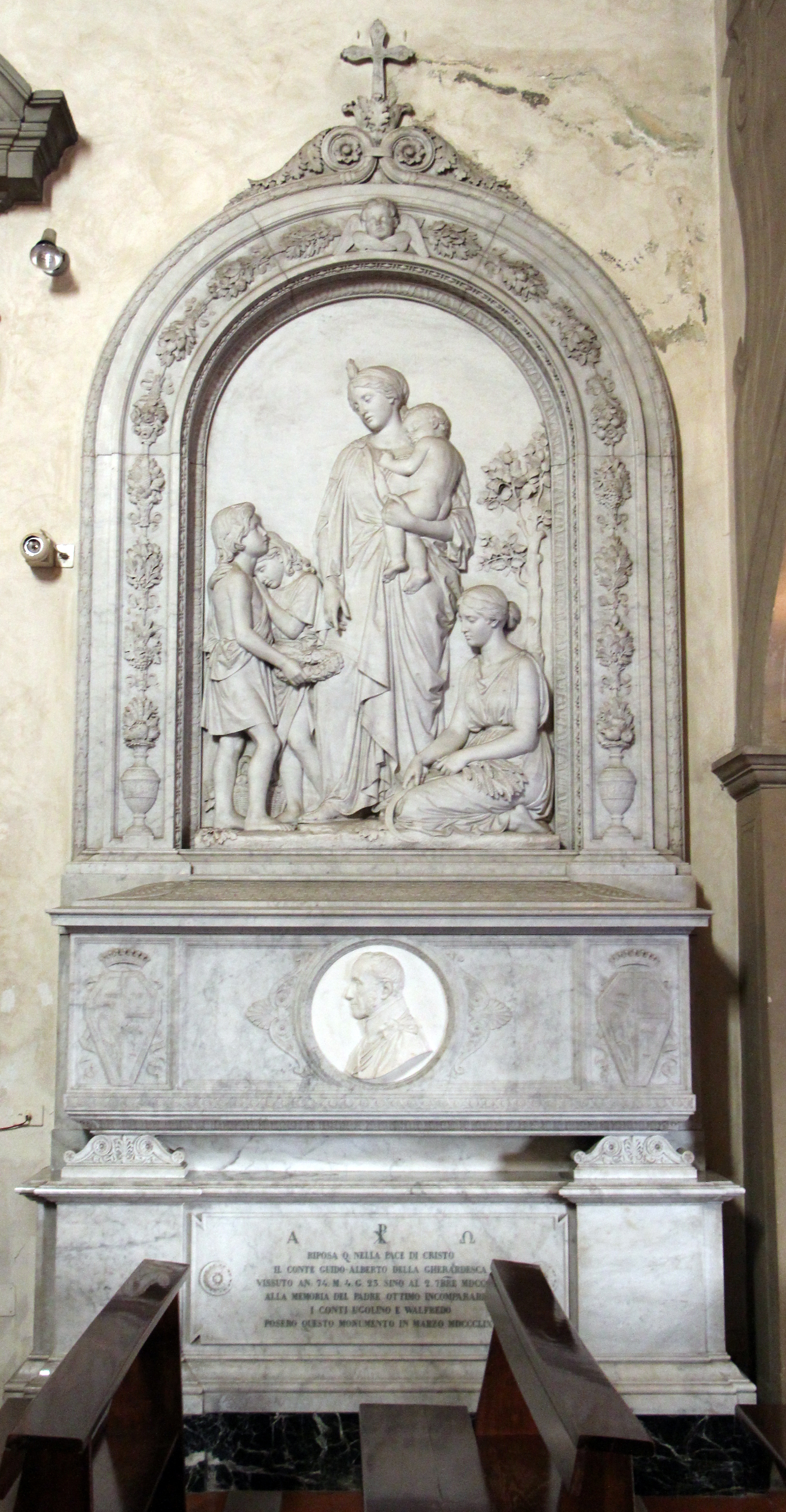
Memorial Della Gherardesca (Santa Maria del Fiore a Lapo, Florence)

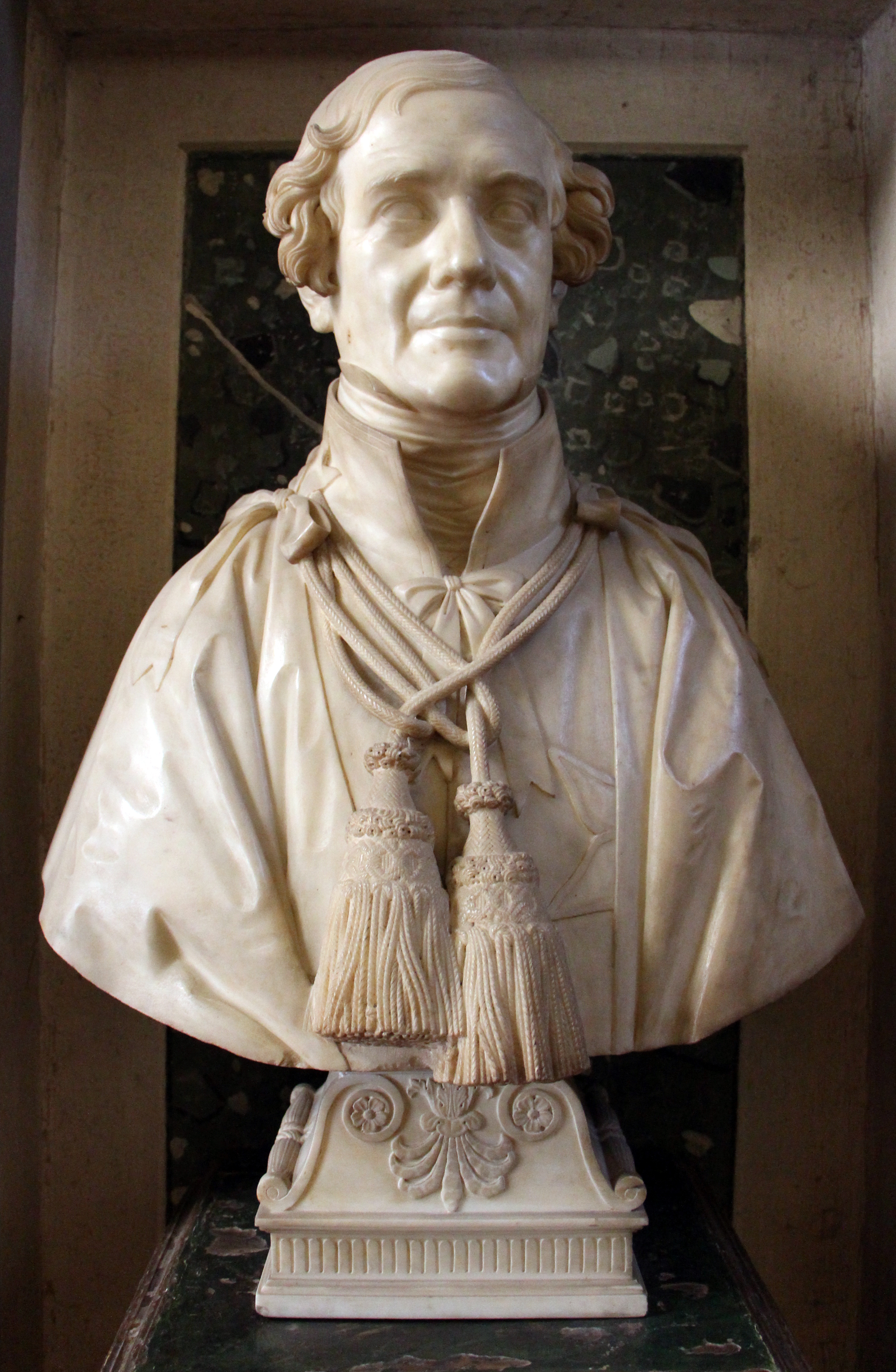
Bust of Cosimo Buonarroti (Casa Buonarroti, Florence)

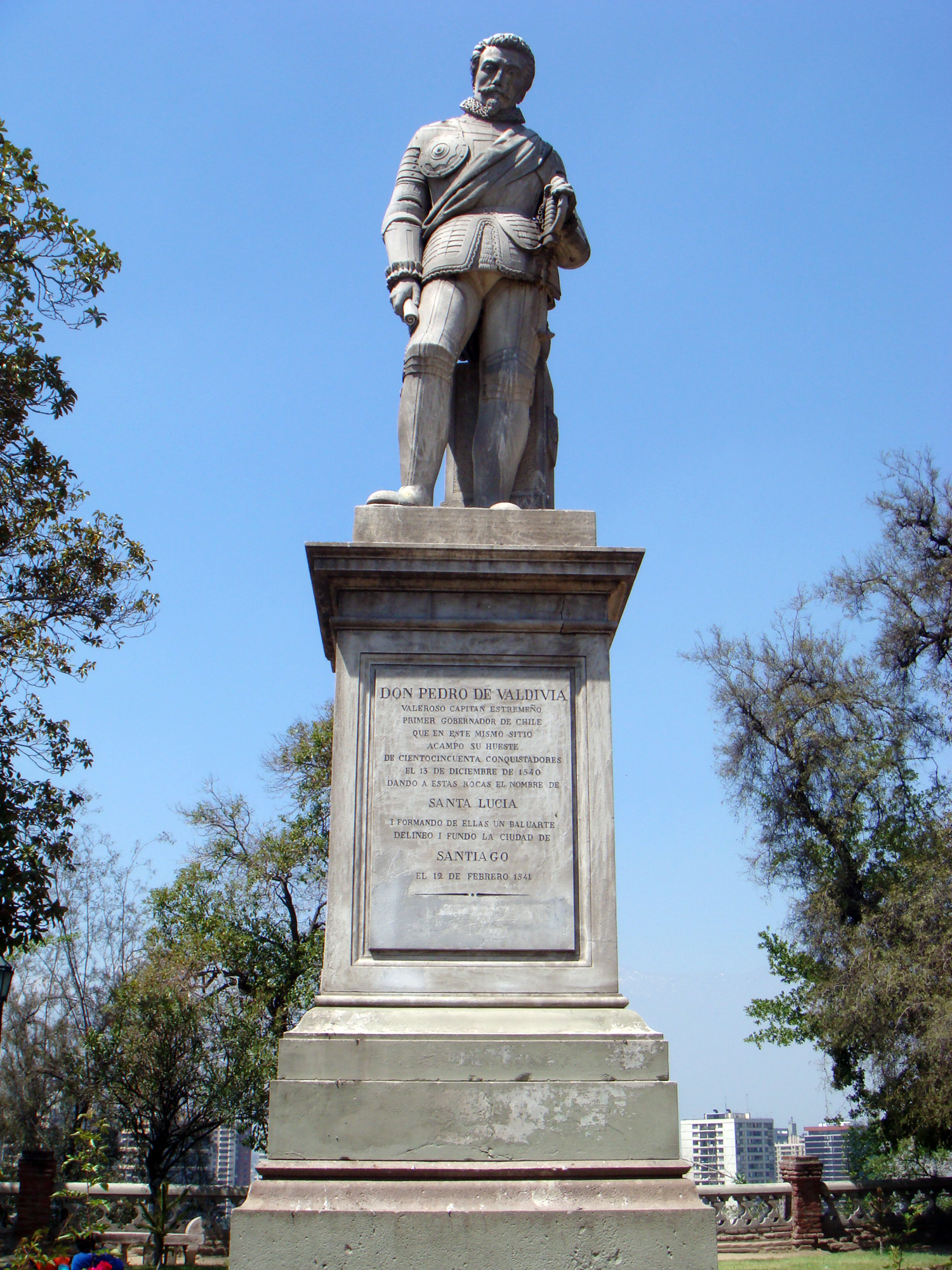
Pedro de Valdivia (Santa Lucía hill, Santiago de Chile)

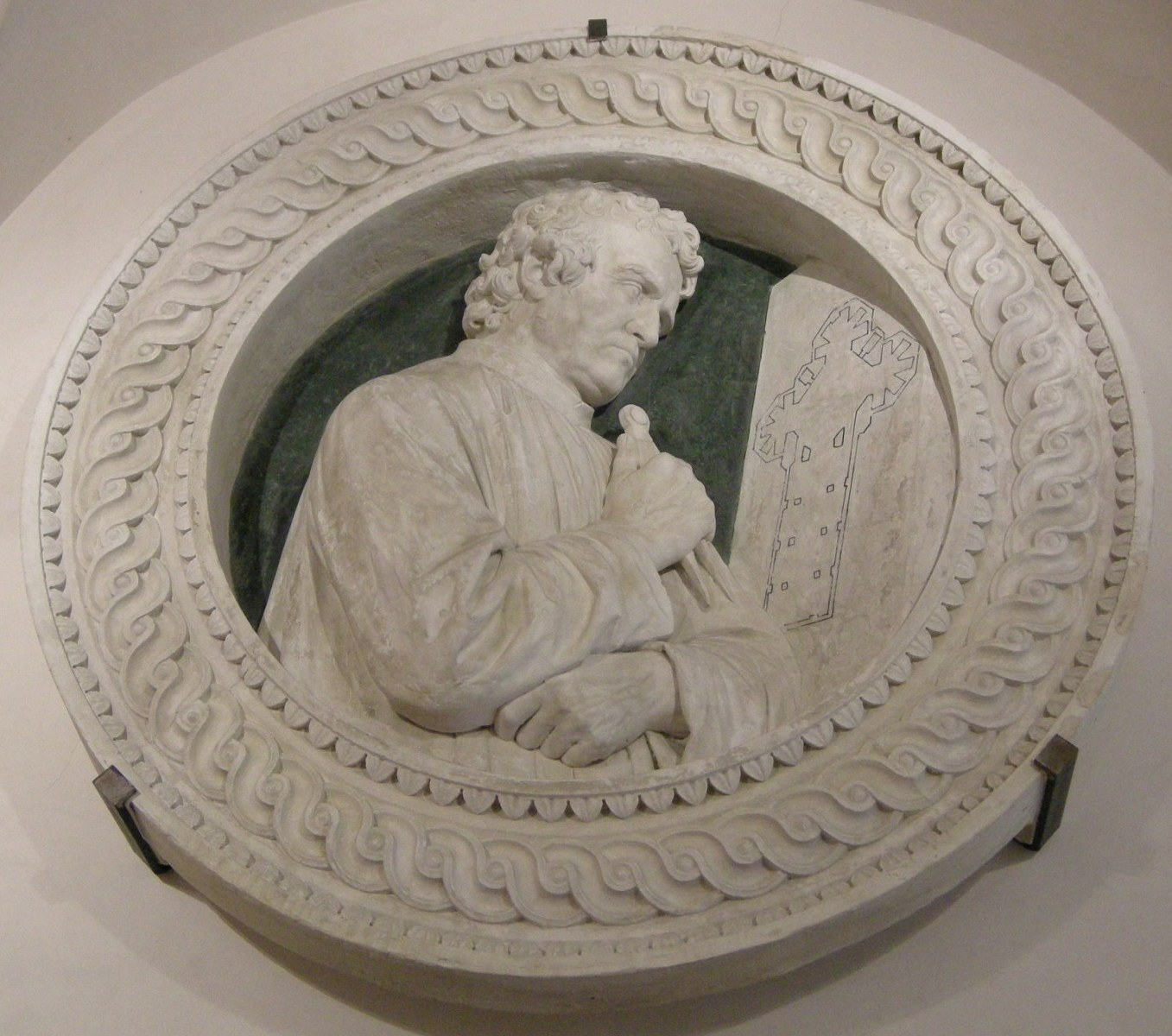
Arnolfo di Cambio (Florence, cathedral)

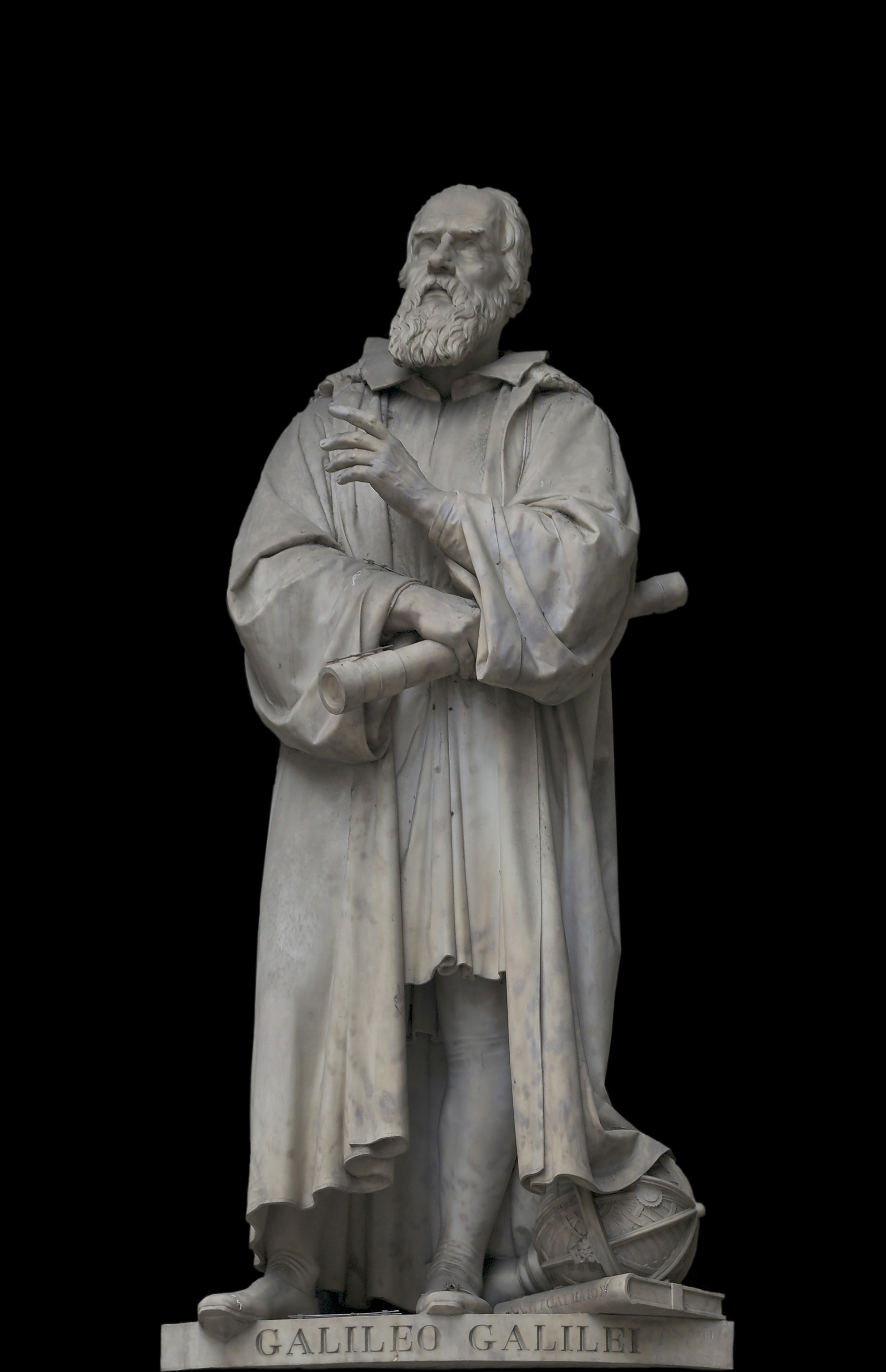
Galileo Galilei (galleria degli Uffizi, Florence)

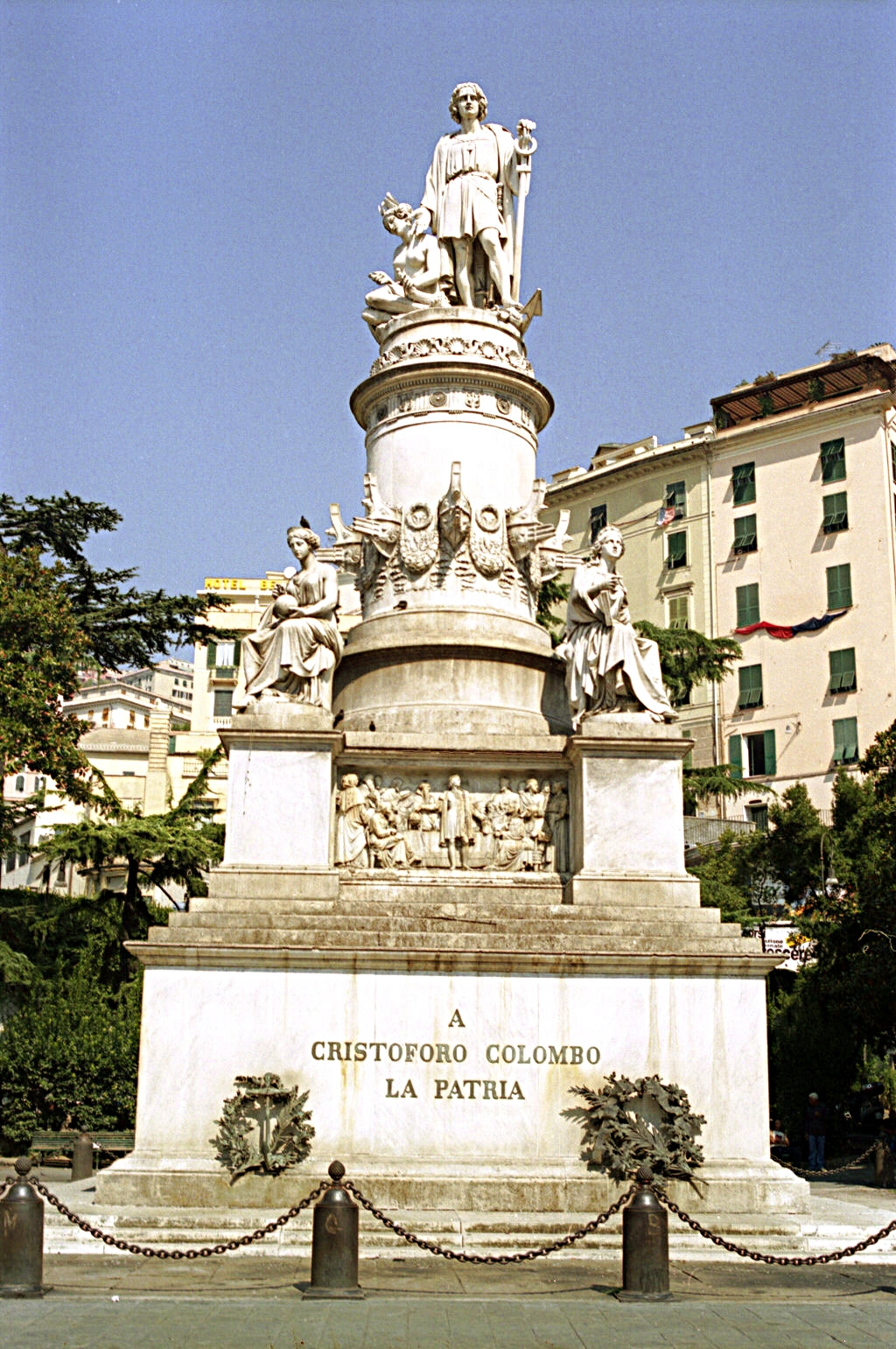
Christopher Columbus monument in Genua, (only two statues on the basement)

== Bibliography ==
- Mackay, James, The Dictionary of Sculptors in Bronze, Antique Collectors Club, Woodbridge, Suffolk 1977
