= Leopoldo Costoli =

Italian sculptor

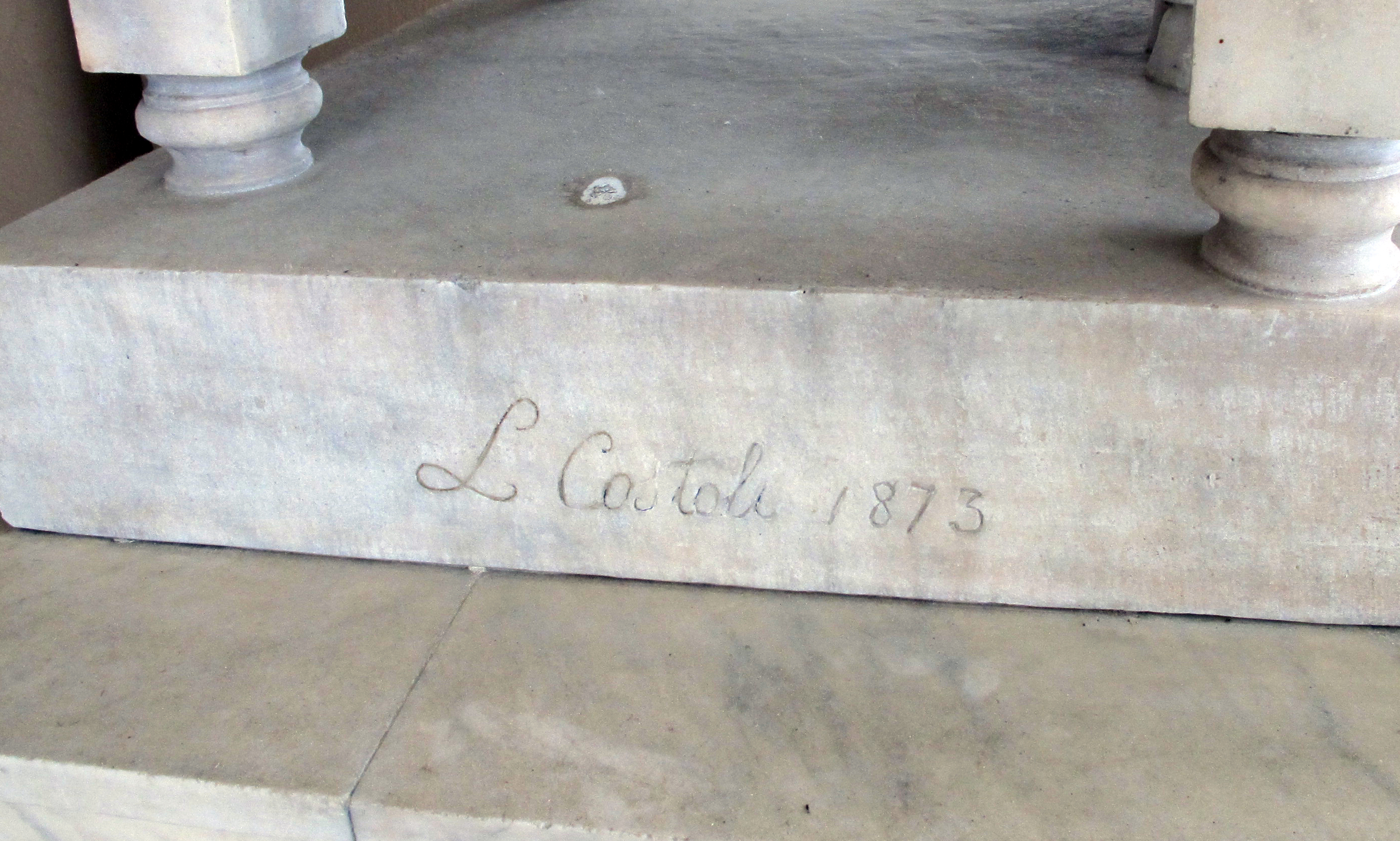
Signature

Leopoldo Costoli (c.1850–1908) was an Italian sculptor.

He was born in Florence, Grand Duchy of Tuscany. He studied and worked with his father Aristodemo Costoli.
