= Ernesto Biondi =

Italian sculptor

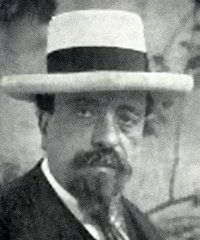
Ernesto Biondi

Ernesto Biondi (January 30, 1855 – 1917) was an Italian sculptor who won the grand prix at the 1900 Exposition Universelle in Paris. In 1905 he sued the New York Metropolitan Museum of Art for breach of contract after they refused to display his Saturnalia. The New York Supreme Court ruled against him, stating that the museum director did not have the authority to initiate contracts without a vote from the board of trustees. Biondi preferred to work with bronze and often explored themes from ancient Rome or the Middle East.

== Biography ==
Biondi was born January 30, 1855, in Morolo, near Frosinone in the Papal State (now Italy). He studied at Rome's Accademia di San Luca under Girolamo Masini. He first came to wide recognition in 1883, when one of his sculptures was exhibited at a national exposition in Rome. At the 1893 Chicago World's Fair thirteen of his works were displayed. He won the grand prix at the 1900 Exposition Universelle in Paris for a sculpture that "commemorate[d] the triumph of health over disease" in Cisterna, Italy. Biondi also won a competition to design a work for the Republic of Chile to honor Manuel Montt and Antonio Varas. In her book The Italy of the Italians, Helen Zimmern, describes the work as depicting "two statesmen [who] are raised on high upon a quadrangular base of bronze, one sitting, and one standing. ... The life work and merits of the two legislators is expressed allegorically around a magnificent base rich in symbolic figures".

=== Saturnalia ===
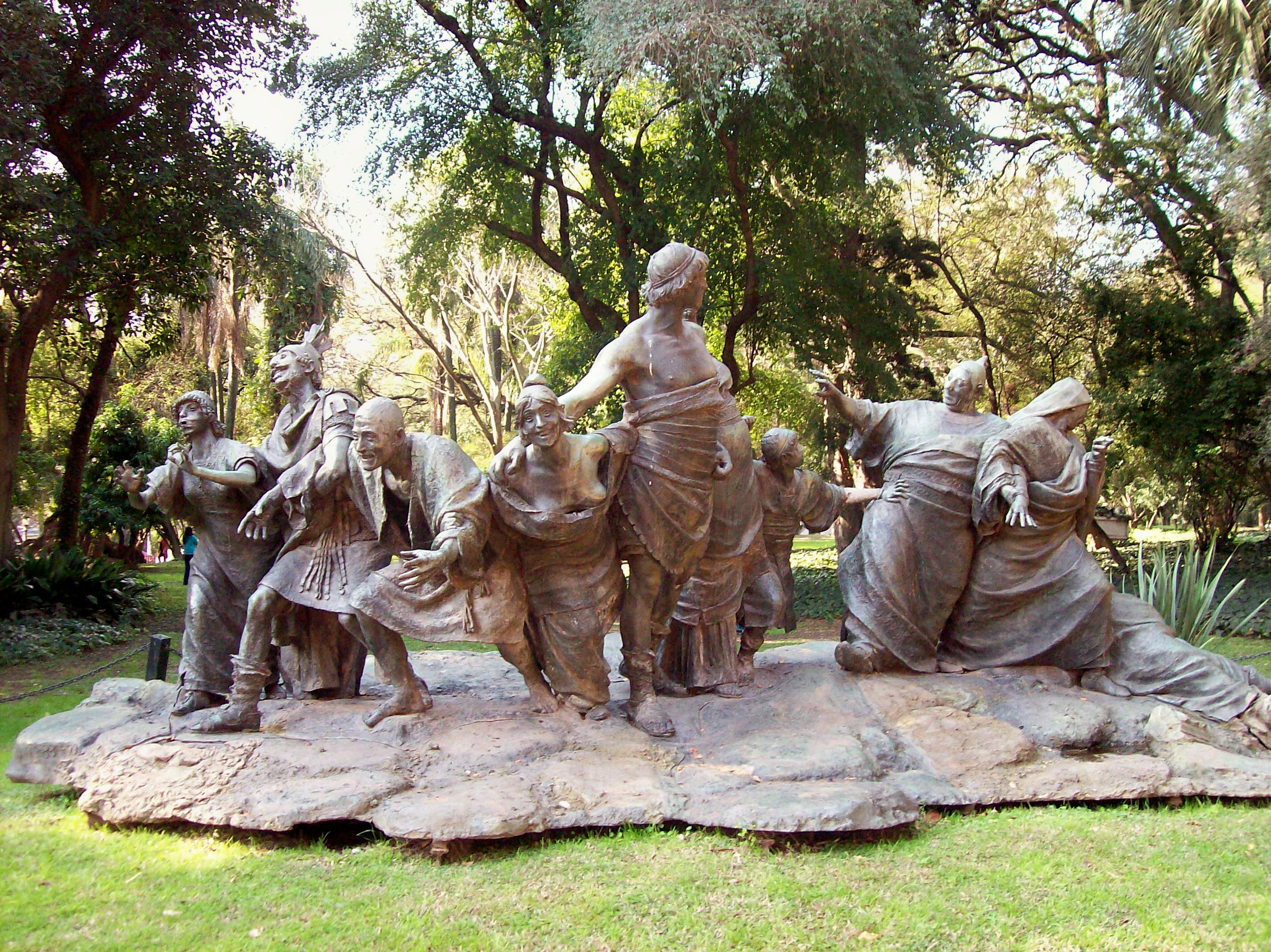
A copy (1909) from the original, at the Buenos Aires Botanical Gardens

At the 1900 Paris exposition, Biondi also displayed his Saturnalia, which depicted 10 life-size figures. Each figure represented a different social class in Rome, from the gladiators and slaves to the patricians. All of the figures had an air of decadence. Many critics did not like the work. Lorado Taft, the preeminent American sculpture critic of his day, said the sculpture "epitomized cruelly. but not unjustly, the trend of contemporary sculpture in Italy, with all its misplaced effort and its incredible, if not to say fiendish, dexterity." However, Zimmern commented that "objections may be raised to it on the score of technique, but its cleverness is indisputable. ... The central idea inculcates that in the midst of revelry the great summons may come."

In 1905 the Metropolitan Museum of Art in New York City agreed to display the work for one year. It was shipped to the United States to be exhibited at the Pan-American exhibition at Buffalo and was set up at the exhibition grounds "Venice in America" in hopes for a sale. After the work did not sell, the director of the Met, General Cesnola, arranged for the work to be set up within the sculpture hall at the museum. At a private viewing before the exhibition opened, museum trustees were appalled by the "immorality" of the work. and ordered it removed from display. Biondi sued the museum for $200,000 for breach of contract and for damages for the harm their actions caused his reputation. The New York Supreme Court ruled in favor of the museum, stating that the museum director did not have the authority to enter into a binding contract without the vote of the board of trustees, and that the document Biondi thought to be a contract was actually a receipt for his work. Biondi's lawyer in the case was Gilbert Ray Hawes.

=== Later life ===
Biondi died in Rome in 1917.

== Style ==
Biondi preferred to work with bronze instead of marble and at one point located his studio near the Nelli Bronze Foundry in Rome so that he could more "easily superintend the process of casting". Many of his sculptures featured Middle Eastern and Asian themes, such as caravans. Other works depicted scenes from ancient Rome.

== Selected works ==
- Fountain of the Puttos, Montelanico, Italy
- Saturnalia 1899
- The Fountain Biondi, Cisterna, Italy
- Monument to the Italian Risorgimento's Heroes, Piazza della Libertà, Frosinone, Italy 1910
