= Girolamo Masini =

Italian artist (1840–1885)

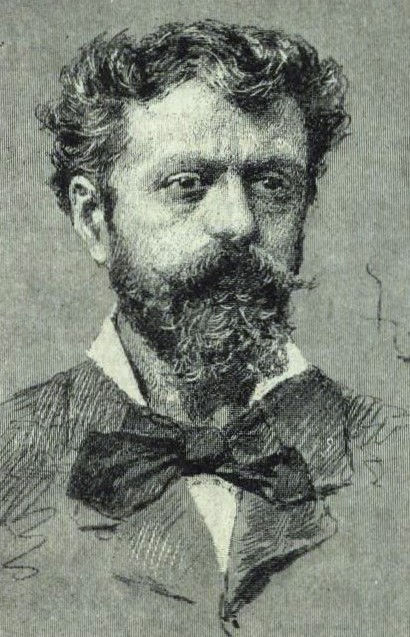
Girolamo Masini

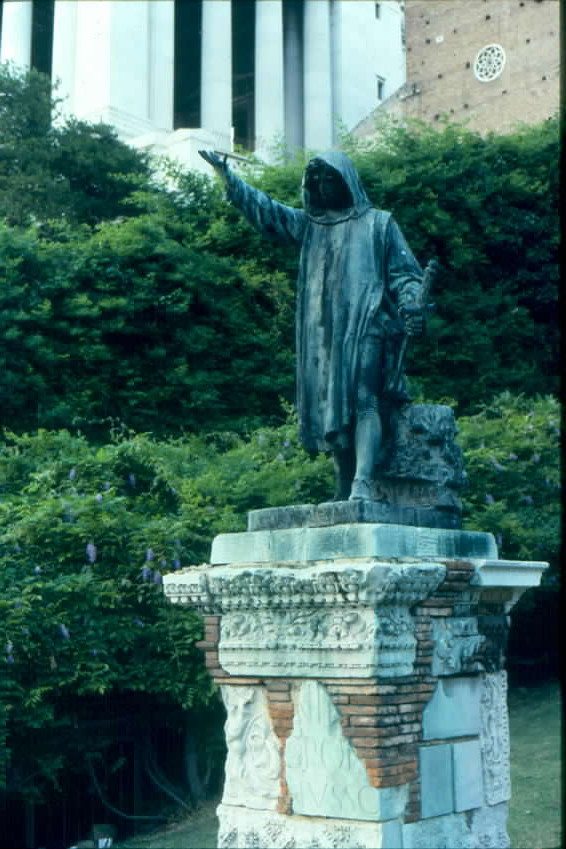
Statue of Cola di Rienzo (1877), Capitol Hill Rome.

Girolamo Masini (December 29, 1840 – 1885) was an Italian sculptor.

== Biography ==
He was born in Florence, Tuscany, where he studied with Aristodemo Costoli. Masini's most prominently-sited work is the bronze statue of Cola di Rienzi (1877) on the left of the stairs leading to the Campidoglio, Rome. Contemporary bronze reductions of it were made.

Masini, a minor member of the Romantic realists of the generation that reacted to the cool Neoclassicism of Canova, taught at the Accademia di San Luca, Rome, where among his pupils were Ernesto Biondi and Attilio Piccirilli, later of New York.

A marble seated Ruth exhibits the realist attention to minor details and the sentimental aura of Masini's style. Another of his works, Fabiola is in the Museum of Modern Art in Rome.

Masini exhibited at the Esposizione Internazionale (1874) in Rome. The same year he finished for the commune of Gropello Cairoli (province of Pavia) a standing figure of Donna Adelaide Bono Cairoli, mother of five patriot sons, memorialized by the comune as five columns round a fountain.

In Hamburg, Masini executed the mourning female figure on the Zimmer tomb at Ohlsdorf Main Cemetery (Hauptfriedhof Ohlsdorf) .

Masini died in Florence in 1885.
