= Minna Peschka-Leutner =

Austrian opera singer

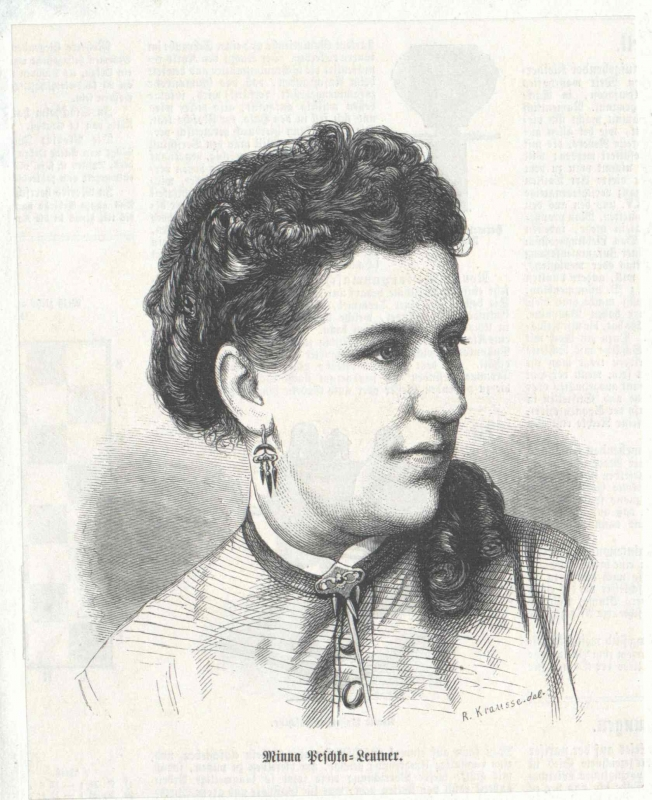
- Born: 25 October 1839; Vienna, Austria
- Died: 12 January 1890 (aged 50); Wiesbaden, Hesse, Germany
- Other names: Minna von Leutner
- Occupation: Opera singer

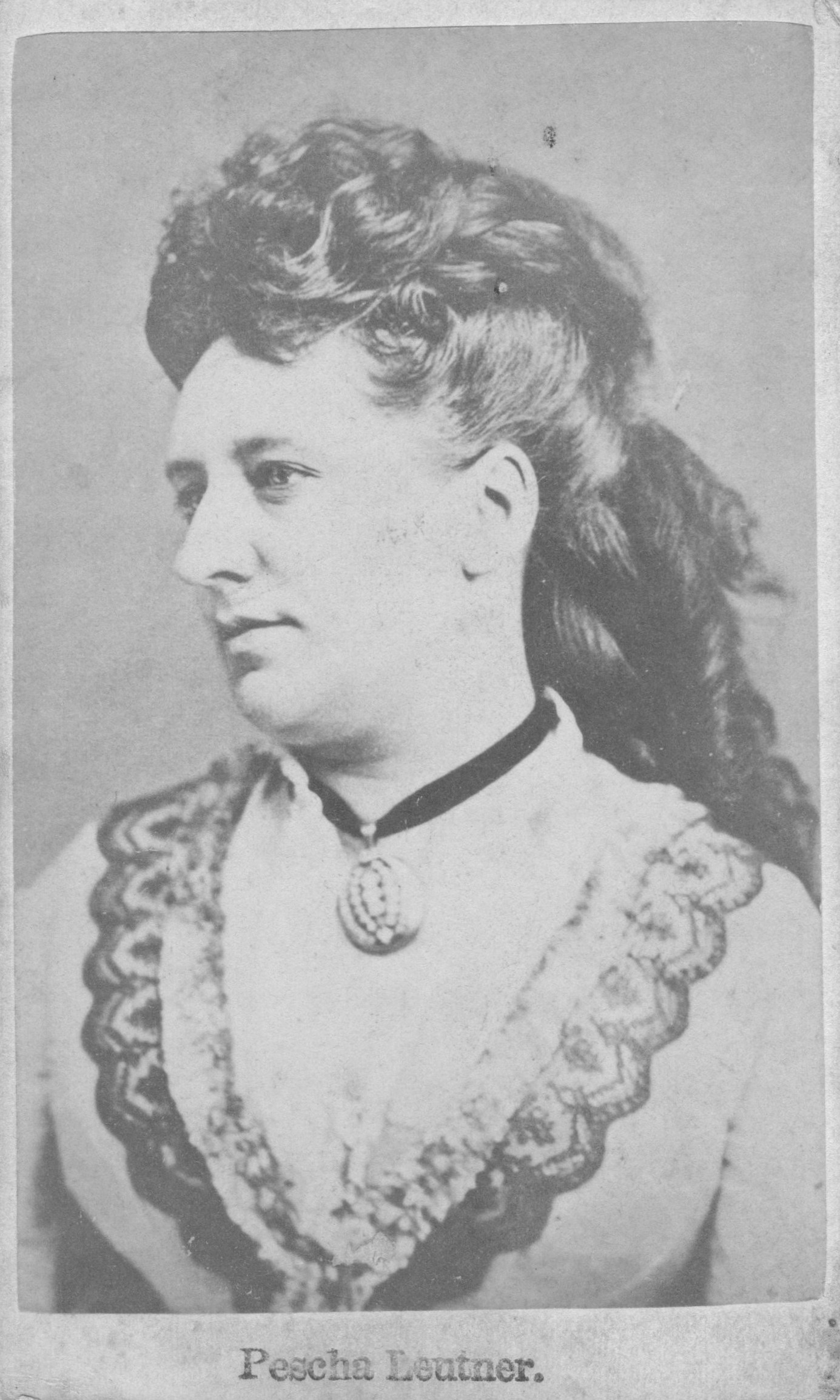

Minna Peschka-Leutner, née Minna von Leutner (25 October 1839 – 12 January 1890) was an Austrian opera singer.

Her voice, a soprano, combined with skill as an actress and her appearance, made her very popular in the main cities of her country, where she was a favourite at festivals and concerts, as well as on stage.

== Career ==
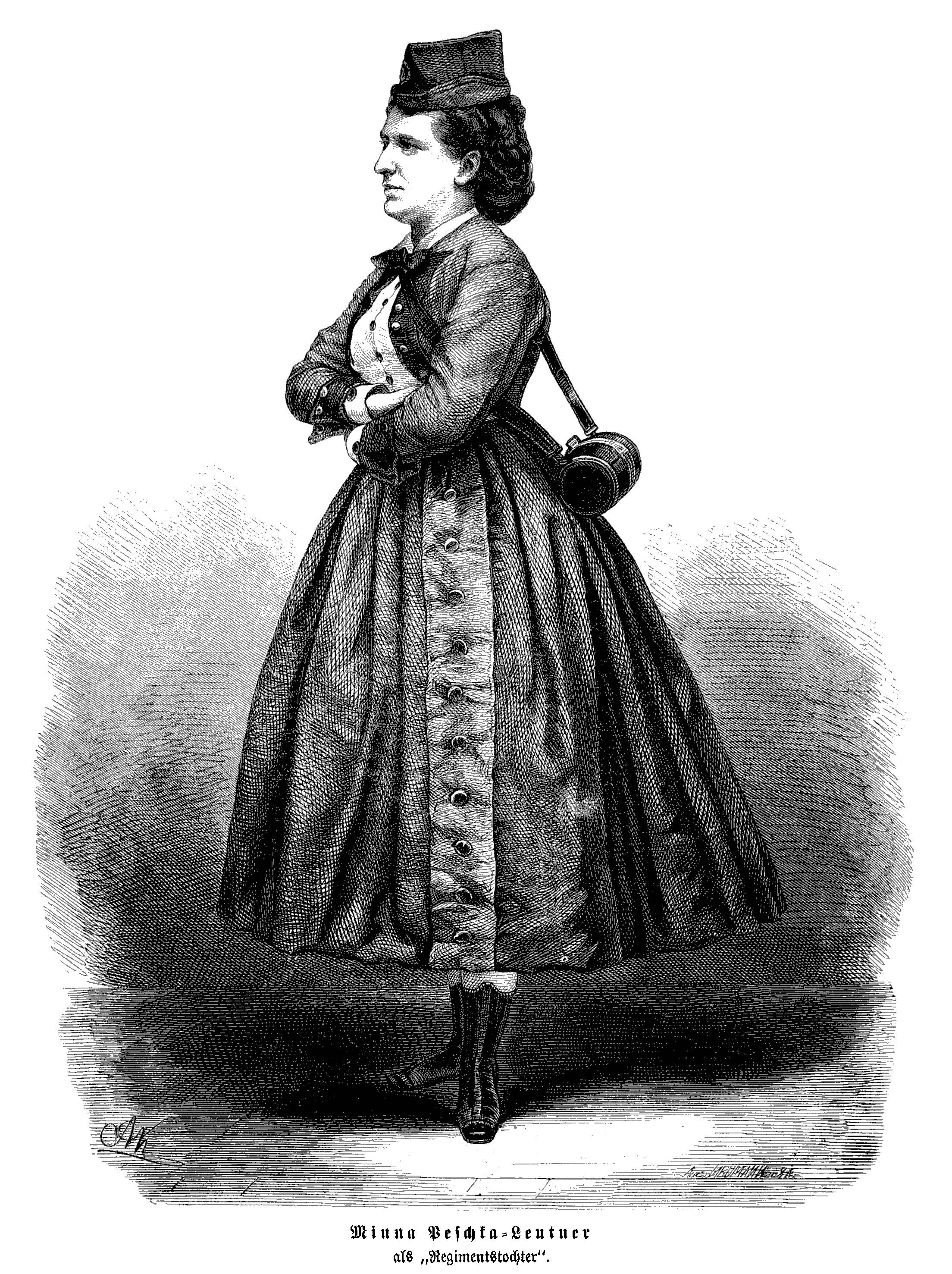
La Fille du Régiment, 1872 in Die Gartenlaube

Born in Vienna, von Leutner was trained in opera by Heinrich Proch, Kapellmeister of the Viennese Theater in der Josefstadt. In 1856, she began her career in Breslau as Agathe in Der Freischütz. It was a great success, thanks to her light soprano voice, her natural taste and her stage intelligence.

From Breslau she moved to Dessau in 1857, became a member of the Hoftheaters Altes Theater, then went to Vienna, where she married the Viennese doctor Johann Peschka in 1861. In Vienna, she worked for two years with Anna Bochkoltz. In 1863, she made her debut as a guest at the Wiener Staatsoper, where she made a success as Marguerite in Les Huguenots, and where she sang successively Robert le Diable, Don Giovanni, The Magic Flute, L'Africaine and various other works.

She sang a concert at Leipzig in the Gewandhaus that included the "Queen of the night"s arias from Mozart's The Magic Flute. She received such applause that Witte, the director of the Stadttheater of Leipzig immediately offered her a contract. She began on August 1, 1868 and continued to enjoy success in that theatre, particularly with her performance of the role of Ophelia in A. Thomas' Hamlet but also at the opera with the concerts of the Gewandhaus, as singer of lieder and oratorios where she remained until 1876.

She sang at the Düsseldorf Festival in 1875.

Peschka-Leutner died in Wiesbaden on 12 January 1890 at age 50.

== References and notes ==
Notes

== Sources ==
- Ludwig Eisenberg, Großes biographisches Lexikon der Deutschen Bühne im XIX. Jahrhundert. Edition by Paul List, Leipzig 1903, p. 760.
- Constantin von Wurzbach: Peschka-Leutner, Minna. In Biographisches Lexikon des Kaiserthums Oesterreich. 22. Theil. Kaiserlich-königliche Hof- und Staatsdruckerei, Wien 1870, read online p. 45 f.
- Die Leipzige Nachtigall on Wikisource in German.
- Peschka, Minna par Alexis Chitty, A Dictionary of Music and Musicians (1900)
- Le Ménestrel, Paris, 1833-1940 (read online), on Gallica
