= Azouaou Mammeri =

Algerian painter (1890/92–1954)

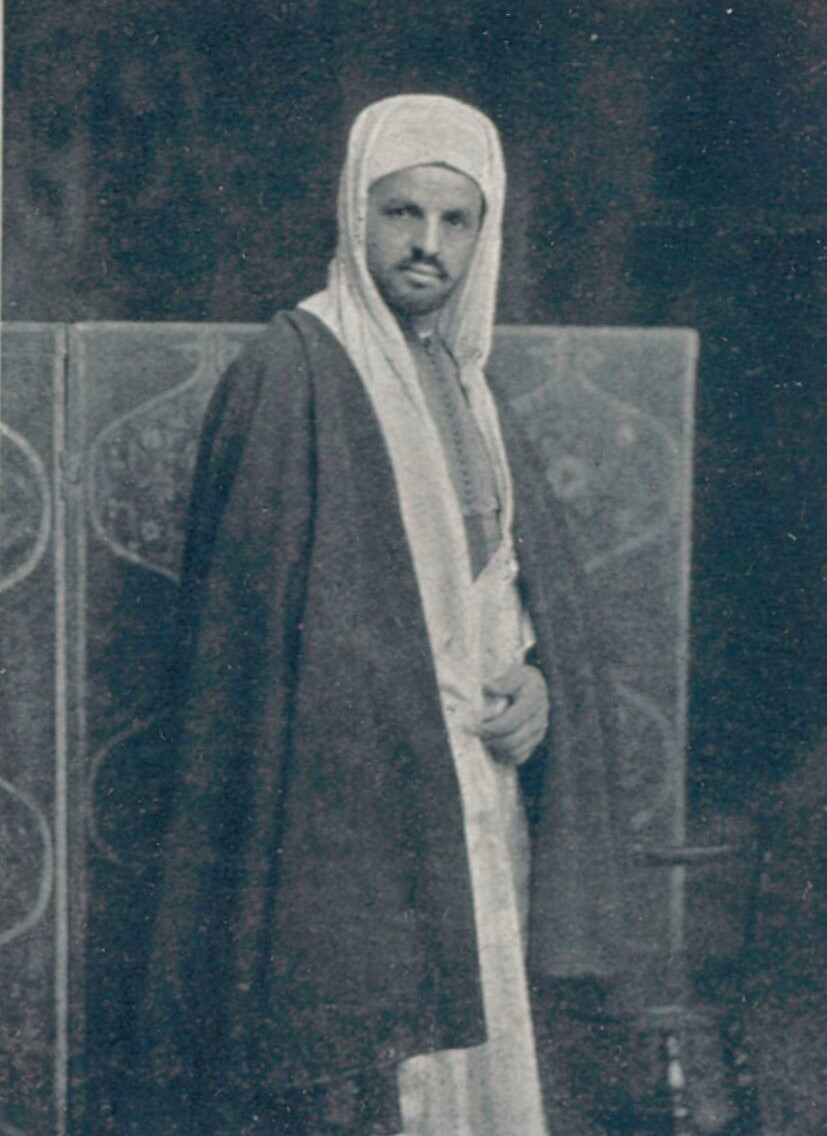
A photograph of Mammeri in 1924

Azouaou Mammeri (1890 or 1892—1954), also known as Si Azouaou Mammeri, was an Algerian painter born in 1890 or 1892 in the village of Taourirt-Mimoun which was part of Aït Yenni. He died on September 17, 1954, in Aït Yenni. His works have appeared in exhibitions in Europe and North Africa, including the 1958 Brussels Exposition universelle and in the Orangerie du Senat in Paris.

== Family and early life ==
Mammeri was born to the Aït Yenni tribe, the son of Saïd ben Mohammed. His family was that of hereditary Caïds, and the region in which he was born near the Kabylia Mountains was considered favorable for the colonial administration's goals of educating the indigenous in French language and culture. From 1906 to 1909, he attended l'École Normale d'Alger in Bouzareah, a training college for schoolteachers. He also visited various cities of France accompanied by student teachers.

== Teaching and early art career (1909–1921) ==
Mammeri was appointed to a teaching position in October 1909 in Toudja, which is near Béjaïa. He met Édouard Herzig, who helped advise him when Mammeri started as a painter. In 1913, Mammeri was appointed to Gouraya, which is between Cherchell and Ténès, and met Léon Carré, who shared his knowledge of painting with him over a period of eight months.

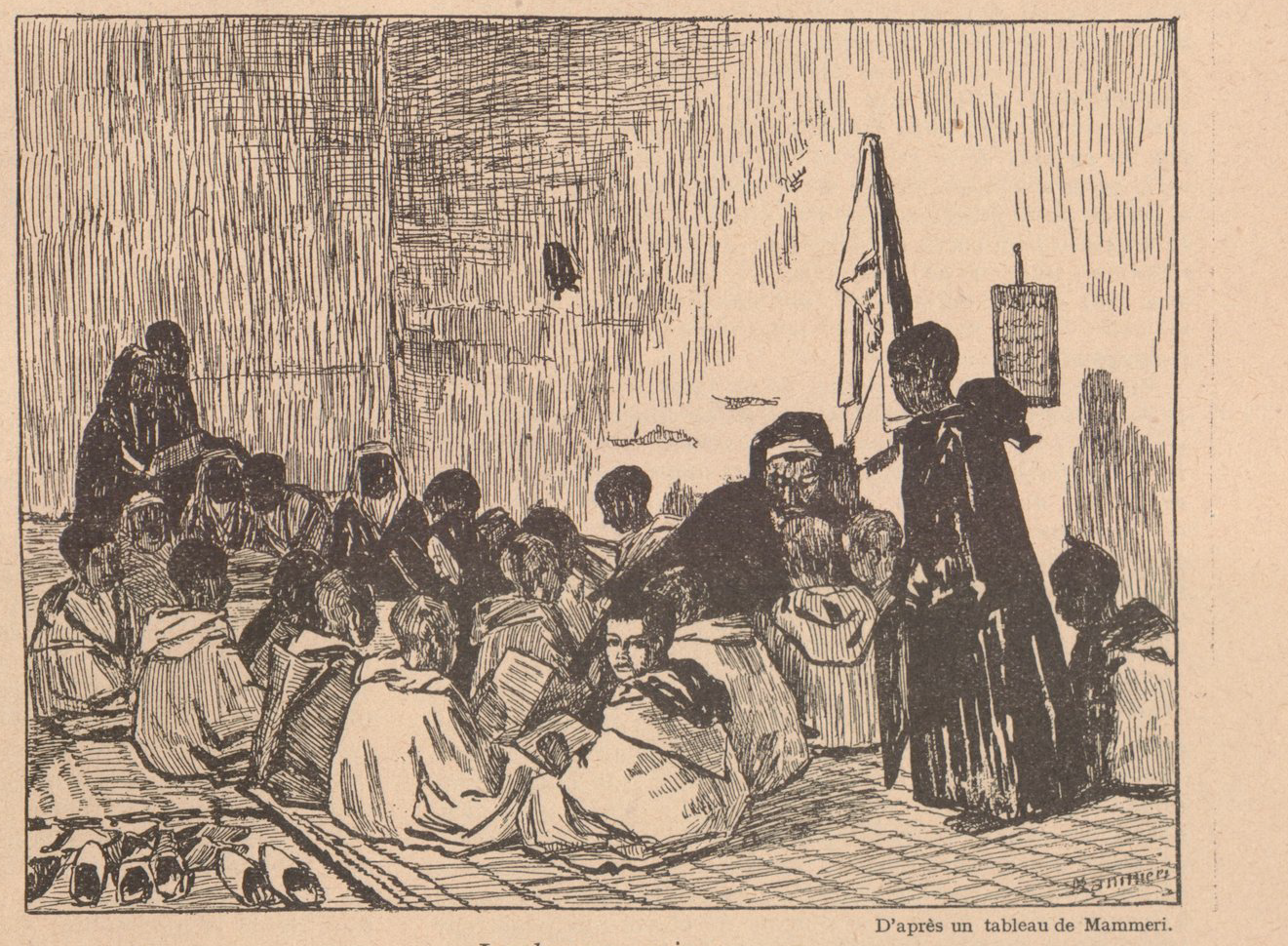
Mammeri's Koranic school drawing, 1918

In 1916, he went to Fez, Morocco, where his cousin, Mohammad Mammeri, was a tutor to the future Mohammed V of Morocco. Mammeri found success in Fez and Rabat as a teacher. Starting in 1917, he contributed to articles in the French government's magazine France-Maroc such as one discussing life in a bilingual primary school in Morocco. His article in the December 1918 issue of France-Maroc contained among other things, one of his important early works, Koranic School. The drawing is similar to his oil painting titled Interior of a Koranic School which is at the Cleveland Museum of Art. The Koranic School painting, along with a few others, were featured in an exhibition in Paris in 1921. In Mammeri's first exhibition in Paris, which was in 1917, he exhibited two landscape paintings of Fez, and in 1921, Léonce Bénédite acquired those for the Musée du Luxembourg.

In 1921, Mammeri started exhibiting his art in Algiers.

== Caïd to the Douar of the Beni-Yanni (1922–1927) ==
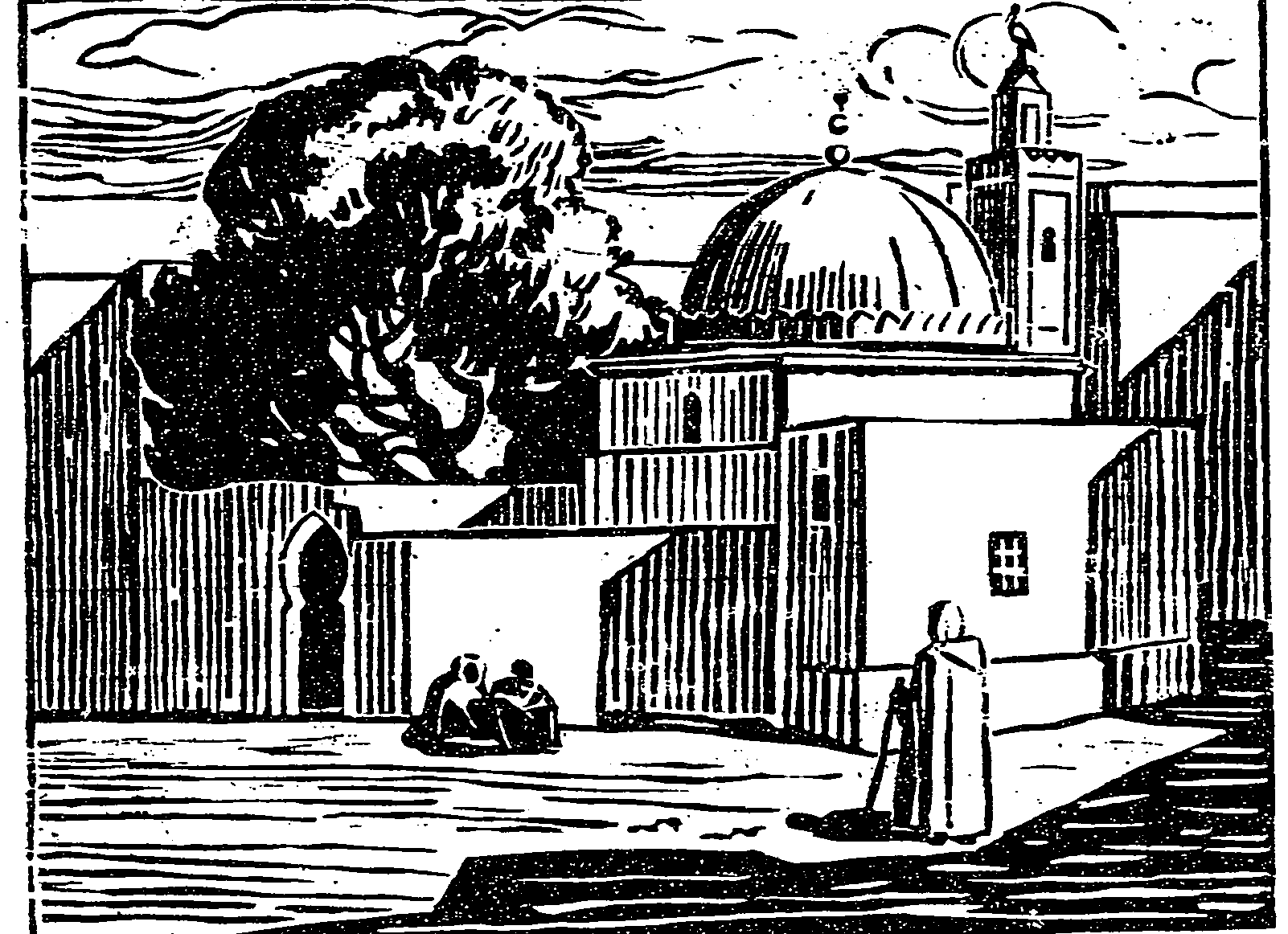
One of Mammeri's woodcuts that was exhibited by the Brooklyn Museum in 1923

With Mammeri's return to Algeria, he became a caïd in 1922, acting as an administrator in the area where he grew up. This was during a period where French interest in his art was high, also attested to by three of Mammeri's woodprints being part of a print exhibition that happened at the Brooklyn Museum in 1923. The woodcuts were said to be from the Society for the Diffusion of French Knowledge in America by a New York Times article, which reflects how critics of the time perceived Mammeri as an "Occidental artist". Mammeri listened to the various problems of locals, who were also excited by Mammeri's art.

== Return to Morocco (1927–1948) ==
In 1927, Mammeri returned to Morocco where he was an art teacher in Fez. In 1928, he became a regional inspector of indigenous arts in Rabat and in 1929, he was appointed as inspector of Moroccan arts in Marrakech, a position he held until 1948 when he retired. After his retirement, Mammeri founded a museum for indigenous arts in Dar Si Said, a school, and orchestras of Andalusian and Berber music with a weekly radio program on Radio Rabat.

He was made a knight in the Legion of Honour in 1950.

== Legacy ==
Mammeri is considered by some to be the most Moroccan of the Algerian artists, and to be the most Algerian of the Moroccan artists. Mammeri is also considered the first and oldest authentic Algerian painter. Mammeri was posthumously awarded le Grand Prix artistique de l'Algérie 1955. Mammeri was included in Jean Sénac's 1963 exhibition of Algerian painters.

Members of Mammeri's extended family include anthropologist Mouloud Mammeri (1917–1989). Mammeri's grandson Azwaw Mammeri (1954–2021), who signed his name as "Azwaw", was also a painter.

== Main exhibitions ==
- Collective exhibitions :
  - 1917 : Paris
  - 1921 : Paris, Pavillon de Marsan
  - 1921 : Algiers, Salon des Orientalistes Algériens
  - 1927 : Algiers, Salon d'Hiver
  - 1930 : Algiers
  - 1931 : Paris, and in the following years Casablanca, Cairo, London, Oran, Rabat
  - 1934 : Naples, Seconda mostra internazionale d'arte coloniale,
  - 1935 : Marrakech, 1er Salon de la France d'Outre-Mer
  - 1936 : Tunis, Salon de Tunis
  - 1937 : Paris, Exposition universelle
  - 1937 : Algiers
  - 1949 : Oran
  - 1951 : Monte-Carlo, Exposition artistique de l'Afrique française
  - 1953 : Constantine, Algeria, 20e artistique de l'Afrique française
  - 1958 : Brussels, Exposition universelle
  - 1963 : Algiers
  - 1974 : Turkey, Algerian Painters
  - 1999 : Algiers
  - 2003 : Marseille, Château Borély and Paris, Orangerie du Sénat, Le sicile de XXe dans l’art algérien
- Personal exhibitions :
  - 1921 : Paris, Galerie Feuillets d'art (preface by Léonce Bénédite)
  - 1924 : Algiers
  - 1925 : Galerie Georges-Petit, Paris (Marshal's letter by Lyautey)
  - 1927 : Cleveland Museum, Brooklyn Museum and French Institute
  - 1952 : Algiers, galerie Bosco
  - 1966 : Algiers, Exposition rétrospective, Galerie Pasteur

== Museums ==
- Institut du Monde Arabe, Paris : Intérieur de la mosquée Karaouine, 1921
- National Museum of Fine Arts of Algiers, Algiers : Village kabyle
- Ahmed Zabana National Museum, Oran : La porte à Mogador
- Musée d'Orsay, Paris : Vue de Fez, 1921
- Cleveland Museum of Art, Ohio : Interior of a School Coranique, 1923
- Cirta National Museum, Constantine
- French Institute Alliance Française, New York

== Bibliography and sources ==
- J. Gasser, L'école nord-africaine dans l'art français contemporain, Paris, Les œuvres représentatives, 1931.
- P. Angéli, Les maîtres de la peinture Algérienne, other editions and 1956.
- Azouaou Mammeri, Comment je suis venu à la peinture, Rabat, Conférence Rotary-Club Maroc, 1950.
- Louis-Eugène Angeli, in Algéria, n°42, May-June 1955, pp. 40-44.
- Musées d'Algérie, II, L'art populaire et contemporain, Algiers, Ministry of Information and culture, 1973 (reproduction of Femme dans le patio, p. 69).
- L'Algérie, Éditions Enal, Algiers 1988.
- Dalila Mahhamed-Orfali, Chefs-d'œuvre du Musée national des beaux-arts d'Alger, Algiers, 1999 (reproduction : Village Kabyle n° 73.
- Marion Vidal-Bué, Alger et ses peintres (1830-1960), Paris, Paris-Méditerranée, 2000.
- Élisabeth Cazenave, Les artistes de l'Algérie. Dictionnaire des peintres, sculpteurs, graveurs, 1830-1962, Bernard Giovanangeli editor, Association Abd-el-Tif, 2001.
- Mansour Abrous, Les artistes algériens, dictionnaire biographique 1917-1999, Algiers, Casbah Éditions, 2002, 4th edition, L'Harmattan, 242 pages ISBN 2296016901.
- 50e anniversaire de la mort de Mammeri Azouaou, le maître de la peinture moderne dans L'Expression, 5 october 2004.
- Véronique Llorens, La peinture algérienne, thesis dissertation, Paris.
- Marion Vidal-Bué, L'Algérie des peintres, 1830-1960, Paris, Éditions Paris Méditerranée / Algiers, Edif 2000, 2002 (reproduction : La vallée de l'Arbâa, Oued Djemâa 1952, p. 83), ISBN 2-84272-143-8
- Le Sicile de XXe dans l’art algérien, (text by Ramon Tio Bellido, Malika Dorbani Bouabdellah, Dalila Mahammad Orfali and Fatma Zohra Zamoum), Château Borély, Marseille / Orangerie du Sénat, Paris, April-August 2003 ISBN 2950676812.
- El Watan, 1 February 2007.
- Pierre Sanchez and Stephane Richemond, La Société des peintres orientalistes français, 1889-1942, et Histoire de la Société des peintres orientalistes français, Éditions l'Échelle de Jacob, Dijon, 2008 ISBN 978-291322473-5.
- François Pouillon (ed.), Dictionnaire des peintres orientalistes de langue française, Karthala, 2008 (note by Michèle Sellès) ISBN 978-2-84586-802-1 BnF 41383309f.
