= Jardin du Luxembourg =

Gardens of the French Senate in Paris

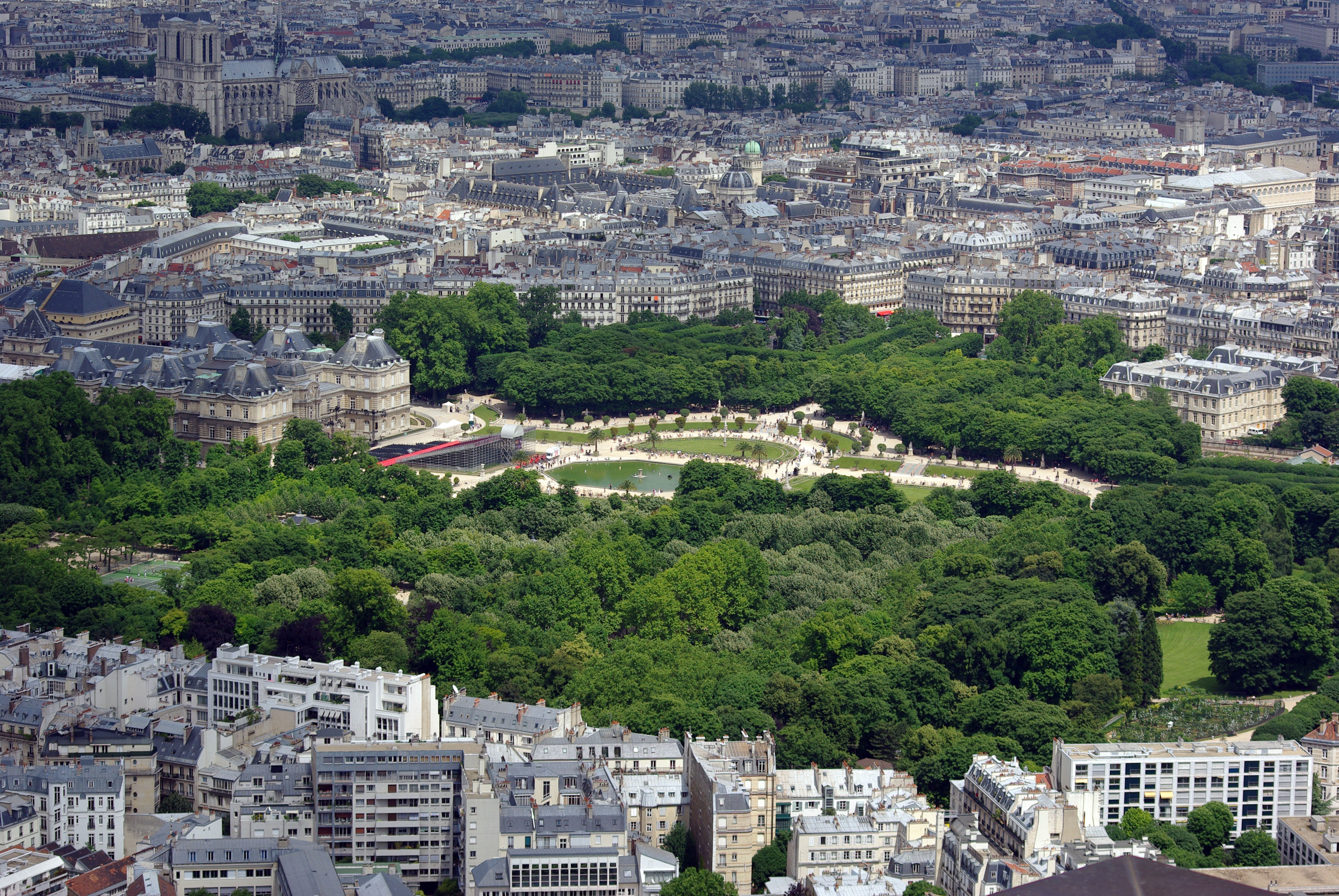
- Jardin du Luxembourg seen from Montparnasse Tower
- Interactive map of Jardin du Luxembourg
- Type: Urban garden
- Location: 6th arrondissement, Paris
- Coordinates: 48°50′49″N 2°20′14″E
- Area: 23 hectares (57 acres)
- Created: 1612
- Status: Open all year
- Public transit: Located near the Luxembourg RER station

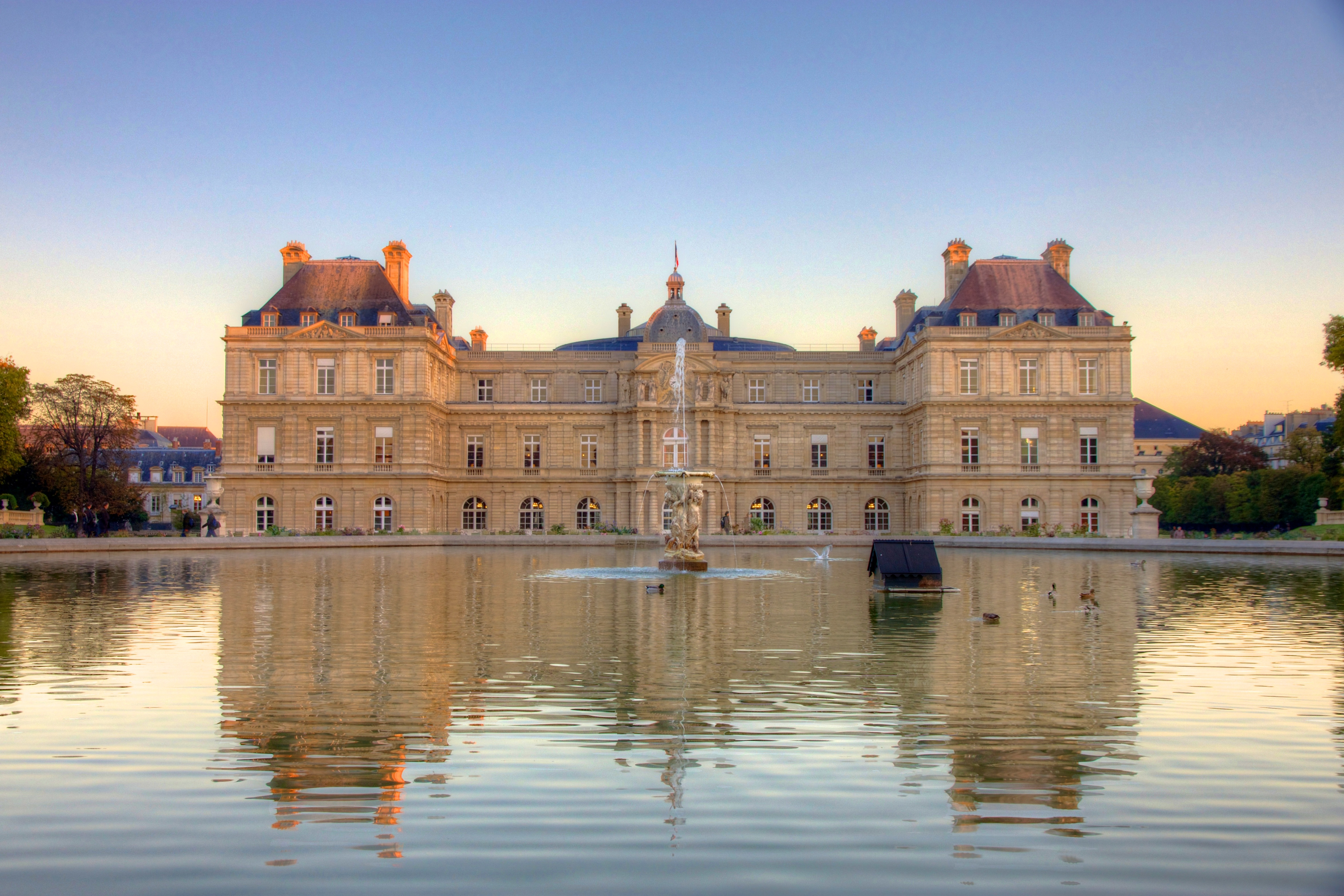
The Luxembourg Palace and the Grand Bassin

The Jardin du Luxembourg (French pronunciation: [ʒaʁdɛ̃ dy lyksɑ̃buʁ]), known in English as the Luxembourg Garden, colloquially referred to as the Jardin du Sénat (Senate Garden), is located in the 6th arrondissement of Paris, France.

The creation of the garden began in 1612 when Marie de' Medici, the widow of King Henry IV, constructed the Luxembourg Palace as her new residence. The garden today is owned by the French Senate, which meets in the palace. It covers 23 hectares (56.8 acres) and is known for its lawns, tree-lined promenades, tennis courts, flowerbeds, model sailboats on its octagonal Grand Bassin, as well as the picturesque Medici Fountain, built in 1620.

Locally, the garden is informally called "le Luco", a name which comes from the Latin Mons Lucotitius, the name of the hill where the garden is located.

== History ==
The Luxembourg Gardens by Albert Edelfelt, 1887

In 1611, Marie de' Medici, the widow of Henry IV and the regent for the King Louis XIII, decided to build a palace in imitation of the Pitti Palace in her native Florence. She purchased the Hôtel du Luxembourg (today the Petit Luxembourg) and began construction of the new palace. She commissioned Salomon de Brosse to build the palace and a fountain, which still exists. In 1612 she had 2,000 elm trees planted; she directed a series of gardeners, most notably Tommaso Francini, to build a park in the style she had known as a child in Florence. Francini planned two terraces with balustrades and parterres laid out along the axis of the château, aligned around a circular basin. He also built the Medici Fountain to the east of the palace as a nymphaeum, an artificial grotto and fountain, without its present pond and statuary. The original garden was just eight hectares in size.

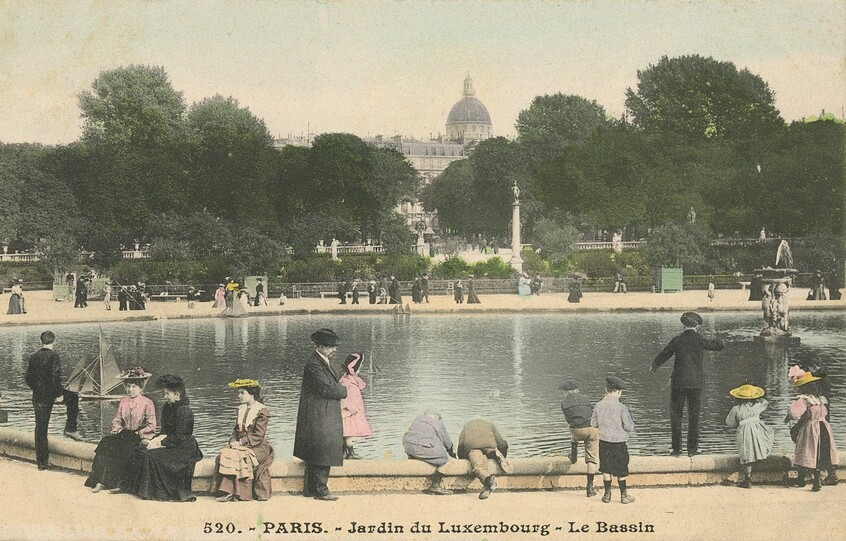
Colored postcard of the Luxembourg Gardens, C19th

In 1630 she bought additional land and enlarged the garden to thirty hectares, and entrusted the work to Jacques Boyceau de la Barauderie, the intendant of the royal Tuileries Garden and the early gardens of Versailles. He was one of the early theorists of the new and more formal garden à la française, and he laid out a series of squares along an east–west alley closed at the east end by the Medici Fountain, and a rectangle of parterres with broderies of flowers and hedges in front of the palace. In the center he placed an octagonal basin with a fountain, with a perspective toward what is now the Paris Observatory.

Later monarchs largely neglected the garden. In 1780, the Comte de Provence, the future Louis XVIII, sold the eastern part of the garden for real estate development. Following the French Revolution, however, the leaders of the French Directory expanded the garden to forty hectares by confiscating the land of the neighboring religious order of the Carthusian monks. The architect Jean-François Chalgrin, the architect of the Arc de Triomphe, took on the task of restoring the garden. He remade the Medici Fountain and laid out a long perspective from the palace to the observatory. He preserved the famous pepiniere, or nursery garden of the Carthusian order, and the old vineyards, and kept the garden in a formal French style.

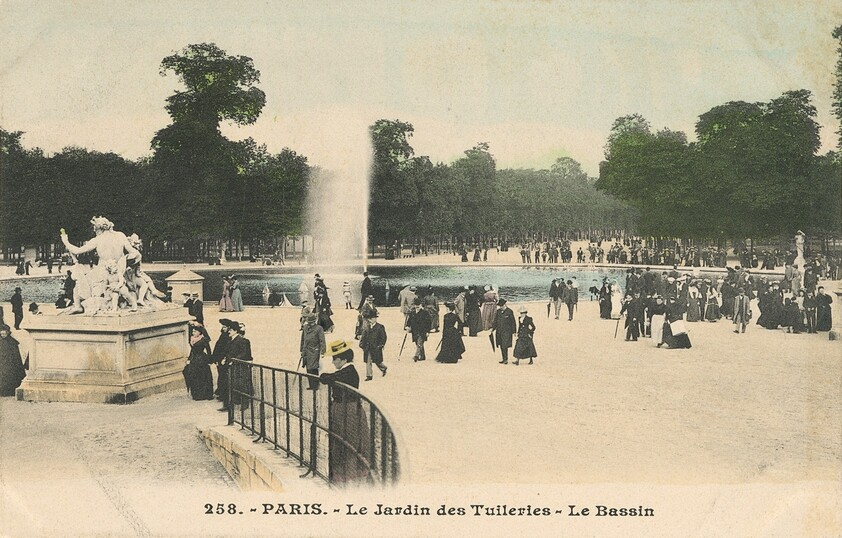
Postcard of the Luxembourg Gardens, C19th

During and after the July Monarchy, the park became the home of a large population of statues; first the queens and famous women of France, lined along the terraces; then, in 1880s and 1890s, monuments to writers and artists, a small-scale model by Bartholdi of his Liberty Enlightening the World (commonly known as the Statue of Liberty) and one modern sculpture by Zadkine. In 1865, during the reconstruction of Paris by Napoleon III, the rue de l'Abbé de l'Épée, (now rue Auguste Comte) was extended into the park, cutting off about seven hectares, including a large part of the old nursery garden. The building of new streets next to the park also required moving and rebuilding the Medici Fountain to its present location. The long basin of the fountain was added at this time, along with the statues at the foot of the fountain.

During this reconstruction, the chief architect of parks and promenades of Paris, Gabriel Davioud, under the leadership of Adolphe Alphand, built new ornamental gates and fences around the park, and polychrome brick garden houses. He also transformed what remained of the old Chartreux nursery garden, at the south end of the park, into an English garden with winding paths, and planted a fruit garden in the southwest corner. He kept the regular geometric pattern of the paths and alleys, but did create one diagonal alley near the Medici fountain, which opened a view of the Panthéon. The garden in the late nineteenth century contained a marionette theater, a music kiosk, greenhouses, an apiary (or bee-house); a rose garden, the fruit orchard, and about seventy works of sculpture and an orangerie.

== Art exhibitions ==
The Orangerie du Sénat was used for displaying sculpture and modern art (used until the 1930s). In 1978 the orangerie was reused once more as an art exhibition space for a retrospective of the Ecole de Paris painter Alexandre Frenel, inaugurated by Alain Poher, President of the French Senate.

The following year, in 1979 the Musée du Luxembourg was formally reopened as a museum by the French Senate. The orangerie today holds temporary art exhibitions. It was first opened to the public as a Beaux-Arts public museum in 1694, the first public museum in France. It was also the first contemporary art museum in Paris, functioning as such in 1818.

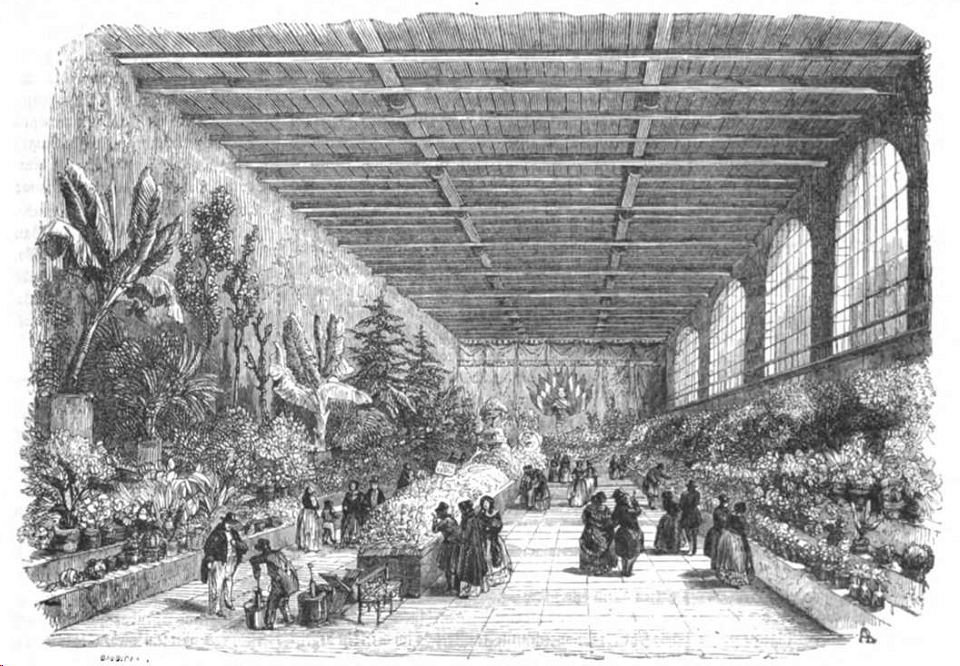
Botanic exhibition in the Orangerie du Sénat in 1843.

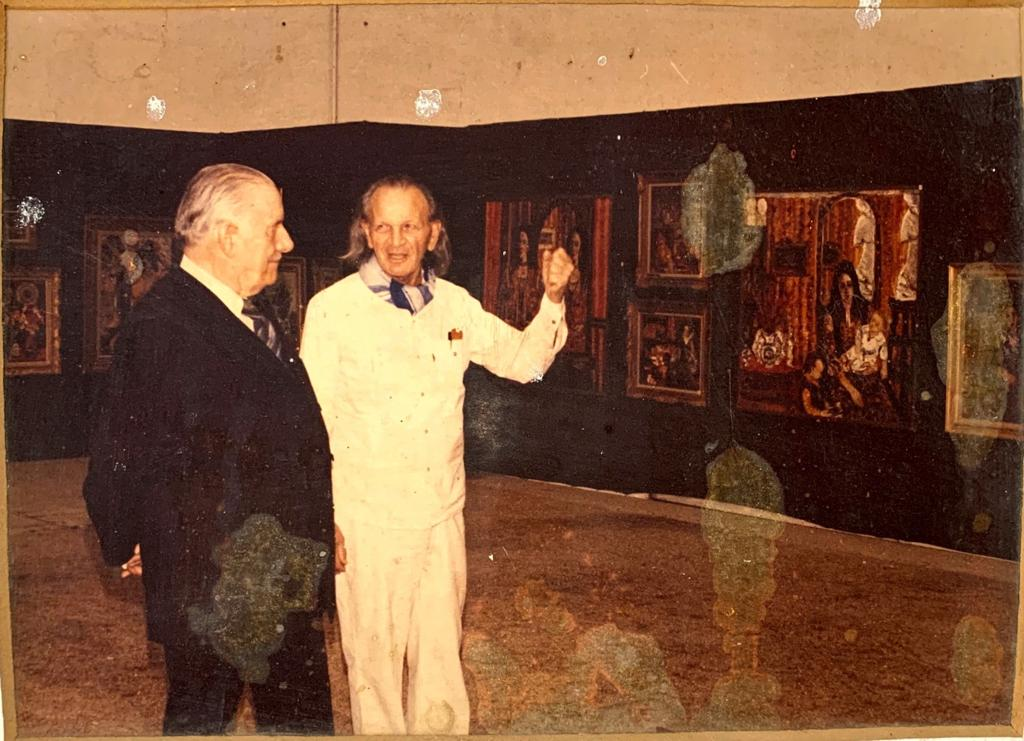
The painter Alexandre Frenel to the right with the President of the French Senate, Alain Poher to the left in a retrospective exhibition in 1978.

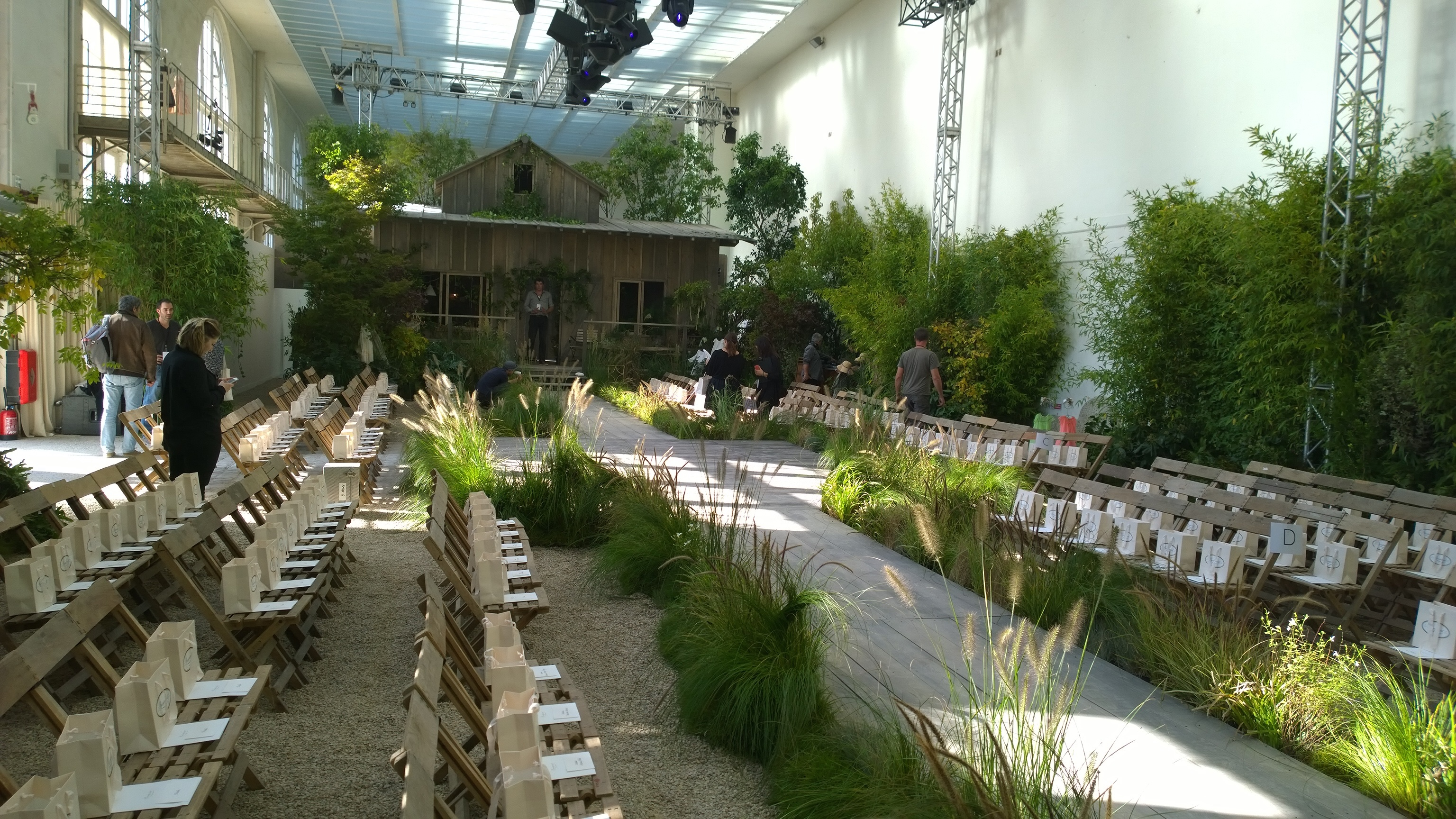
Panoramio exhibition in the Orangerie du Sénat, 2015

== Features ==
Plan of the Jardin du Luxembourg.

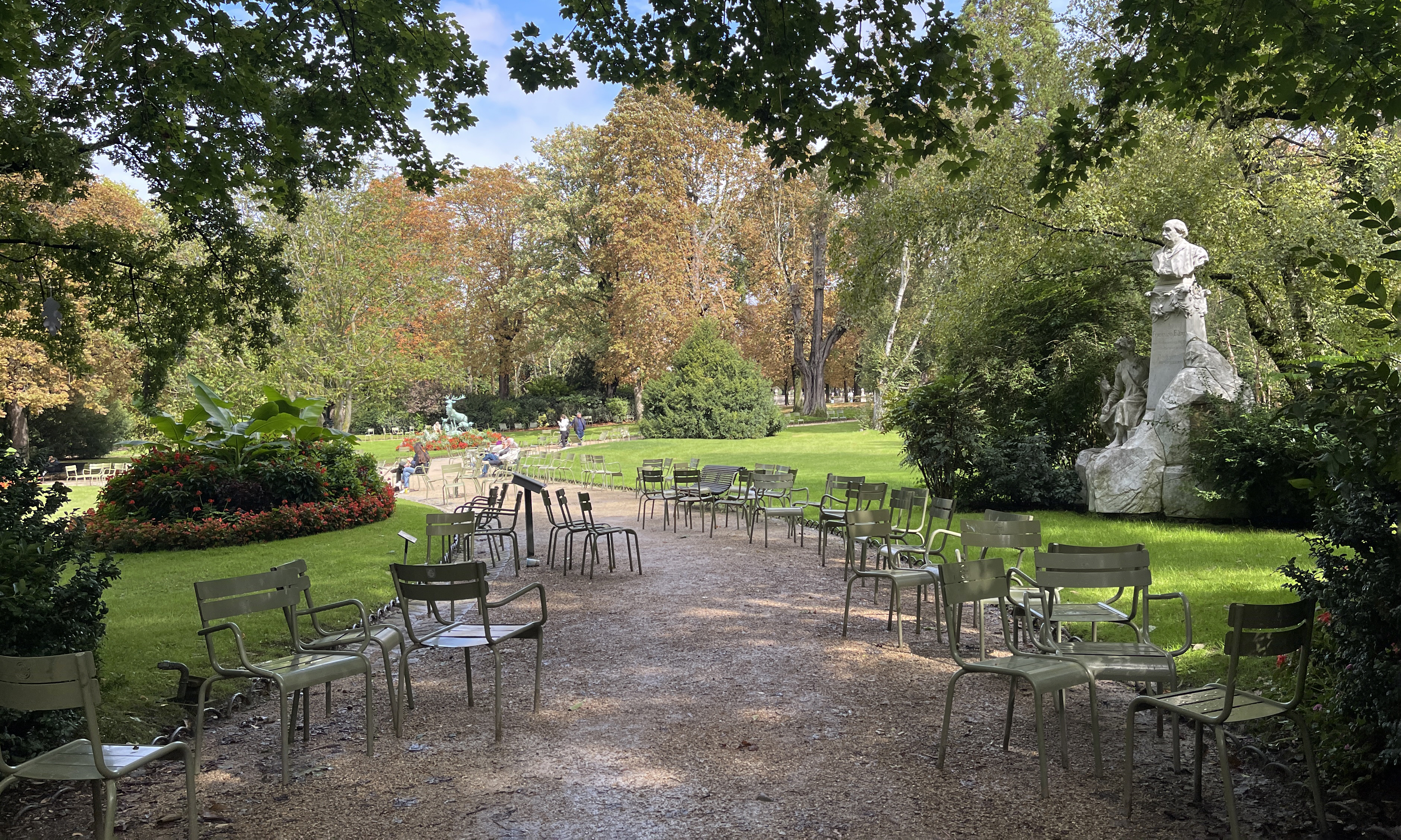
Vintage metal chairs invite visitors to prolong their stay in Paris's Luxembourg Garden.

The garden is largely devoted to a green parterre of gravel and lawn populated with statues and centred on a large octagonal basin of water, with a central jet of water; in it children sail model boats. The garden is famed for its calm atmosphere. Surrounding the bassin on the raised balustraded terraces are a series of statues of former French queens, saints and copies after the antique. In the southwest corner, there is an orchard of apple and pear trees and the théâtre des marionnettes (puppet theatre). The gardens include a large fenced-in playground for young children and their parents and a vintage carousel. In addition, free musical performances are presented in a gazebo on the grounds and there is a small cafe restaurant nearby, under the trees, with both indoor and outdoor seating from which many people enjoy the music over a glass of wine. The orangerie displays art, photography and sculptures. The model boat pond in Conservatory Water in Central Park in Manhattan, New York City, is loosely based on that of one in the Jardin du Luxembourg.

The École nationale supérieure des Mines de Paris and the Odéon theatre stand next to the Luxembourg Garden.

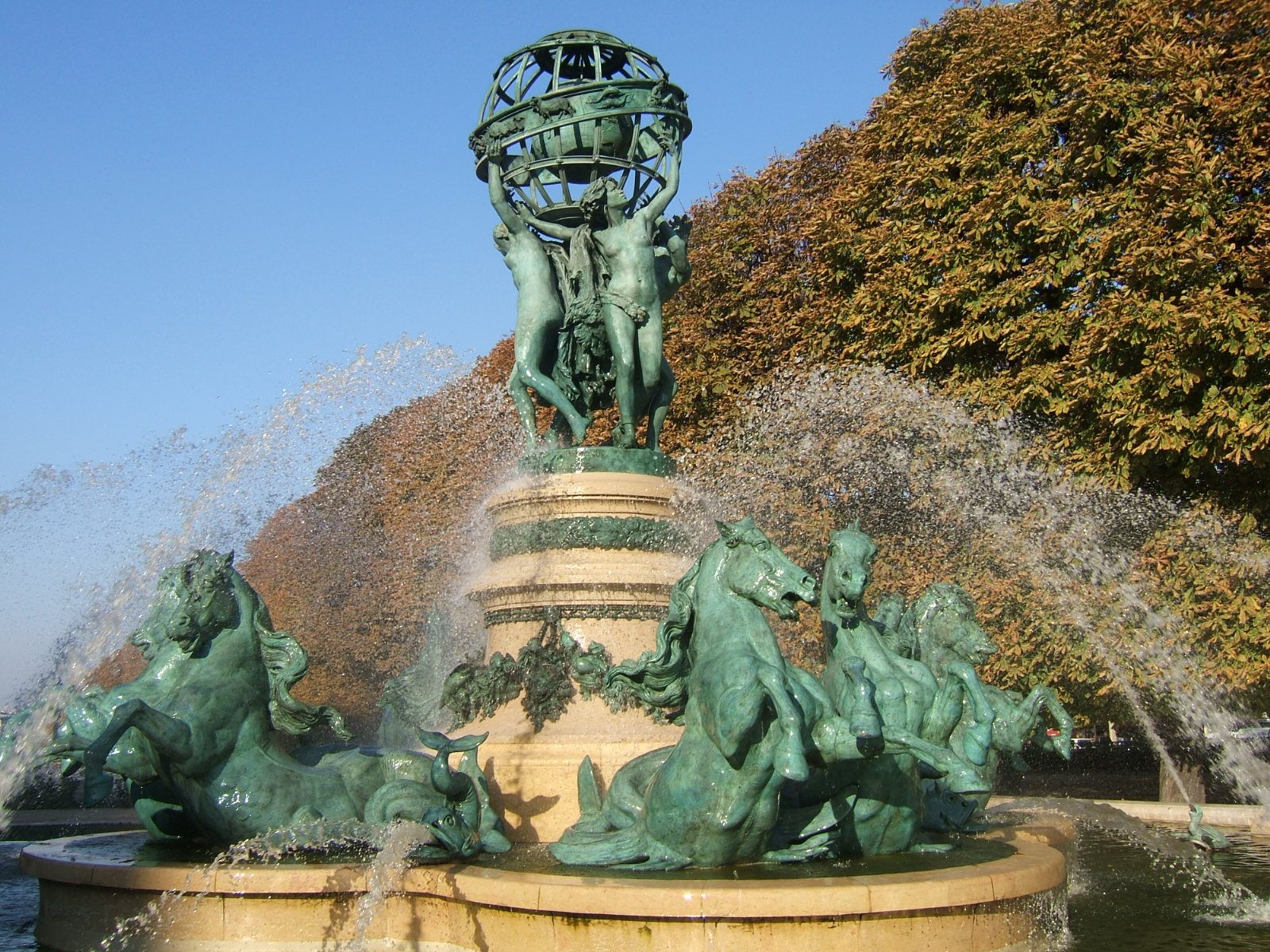
Fountain of the Observatory

The central axis of the garden is extended, beyond its wrought iron grill and gates opening to rue Auguste Comte, by the central esplanade of the rue de l'Observatoire, officially the Jardin Marco Polo, where sculptures of the four Times of Day alternate with columns and culminate at the southern end with the 1874 "Fountain of the Observatory", also known as the "Fontaine des Quatre-Parties-du-Monde" or the "Carpeaux Fountain", for its sculptures by Jean-Baptiste Carpeaux. It was installed as part of the development of the avenue de l'Observatoire by Gabriel Davioud in 1867.

The bronze fountain represents the work of four sculptors: Louis Vuillemot carved the garlands and festoons around the pedestal, Pierre Legrain carved the armillary with interior globe and zodiac band; the animalier Emmanuel Fremiet designed the eight horses, marine turtles and spouting fish. Most importantly Jean-Baptiste Carpeaux sculpted the four nude women supporting the globe, representing the Four Continents of classical iconography.

Open hours for the Luxembourg Garden depend on the month: opening between 7:30 and 8:15 am; closing at dusk between 4:45 and 9:45 pm.

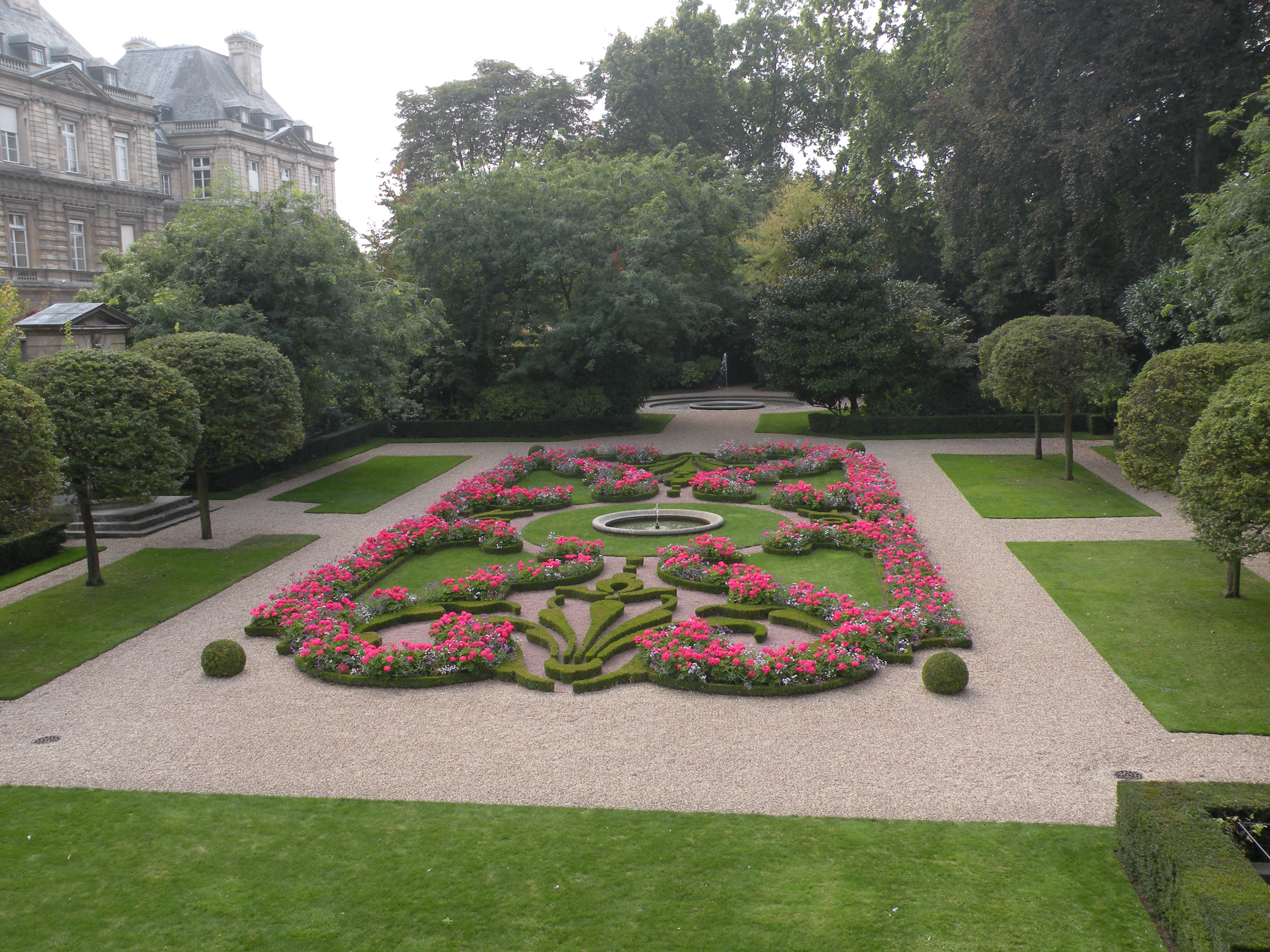
Garden of the Petit Luxembourg

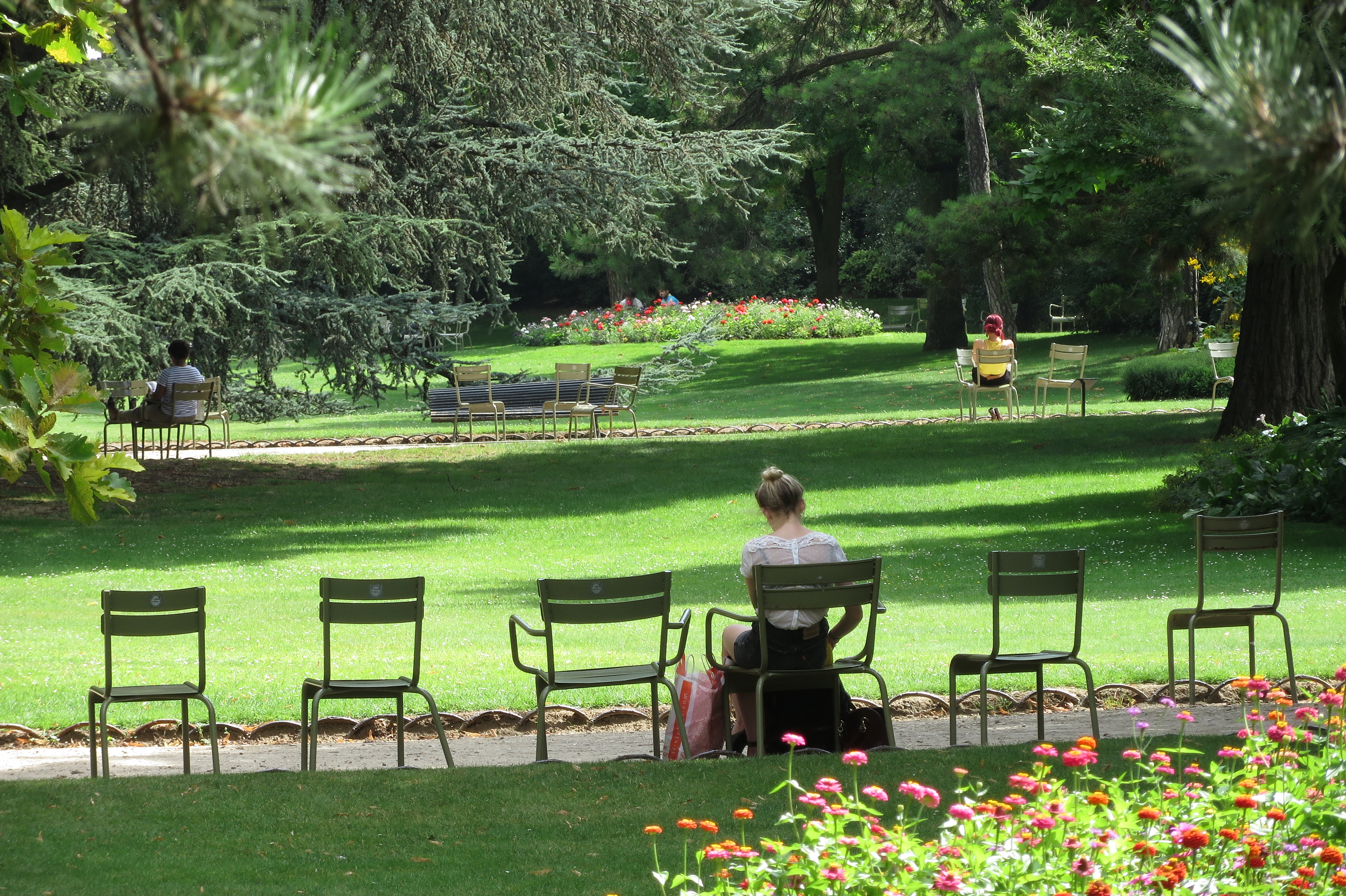
A view of the Luxembourg Garden

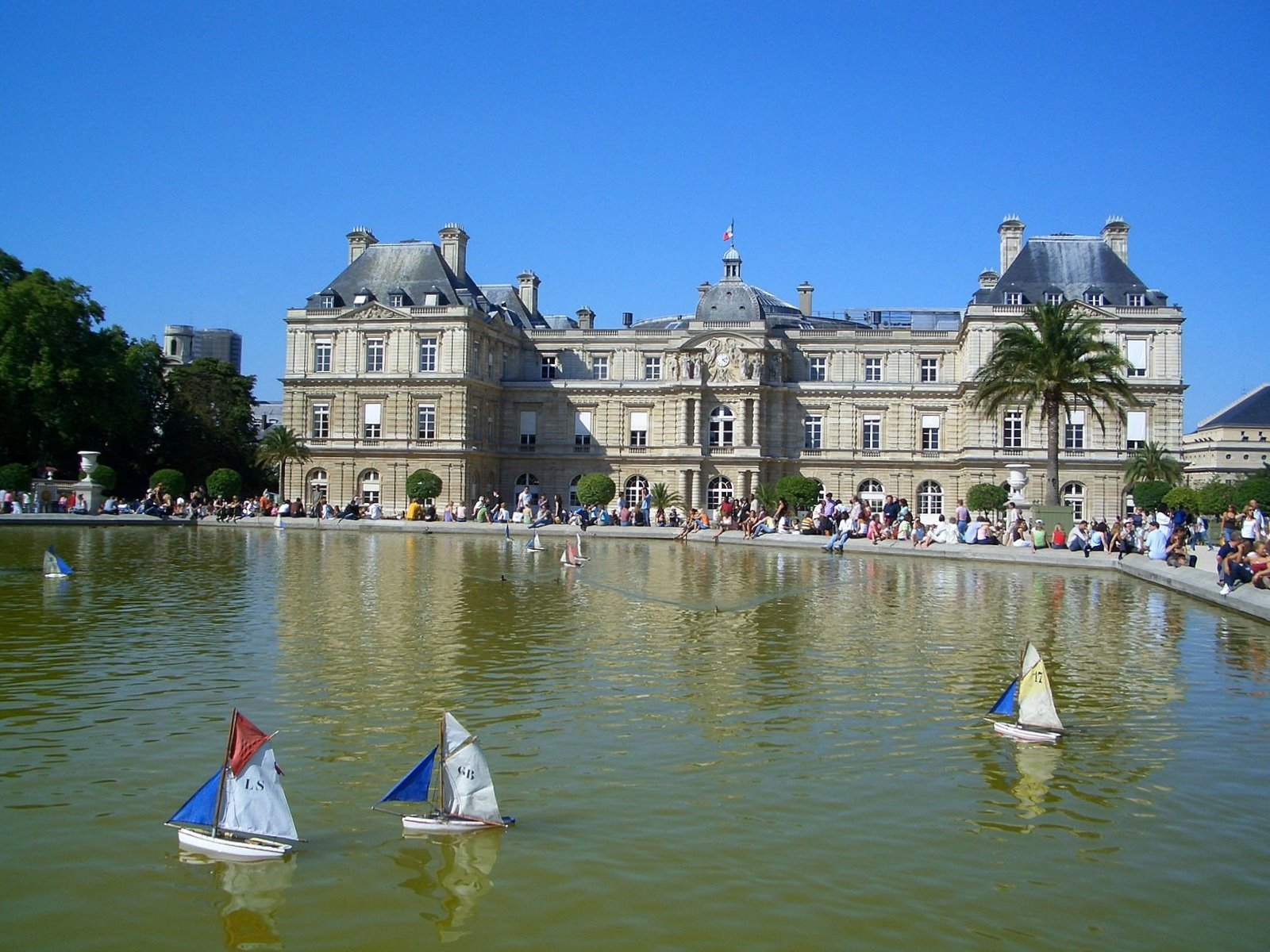
Model sailboats on the Grand Bassin, similar to those found in the Tuileries Garden

== Statuary ==
The garden contains just over a hundred statues, monuments, and fountains, scattered throughout the grounds. Surrounding the central green space are twenty figures of French queens and illustrious women standing on pedestals. They were commissioned by Louis Philippe I in 1848 and include: Anne of Austria, Anne of Brittany, Anne of France, Anne Marie Louise of Orléans, Bertha of Burgundy, Blanche of Castile, Clémence Isaure, Jeanne III of Navarre, Laure de Noves, Louise of Savoy, Margaret of Anjou, Margaret of Provence, Marguerite de Navarre, Marie de' Medici, Mary, Queen of Scots, Matilda of Flanders, Saint Balthild, Saint Clotilde, Saint Genevieve, and Valentina Visconti.

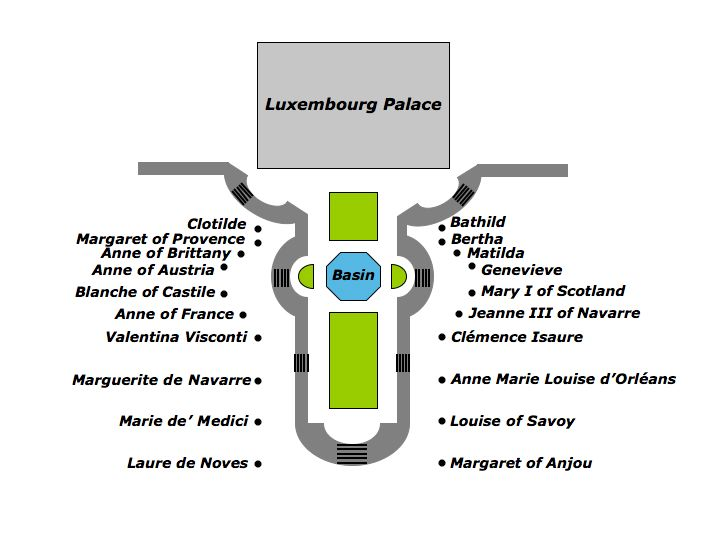
Location of the series Reines de France et Femmes illustres (Queens of France and Famous Women) around the central basin.

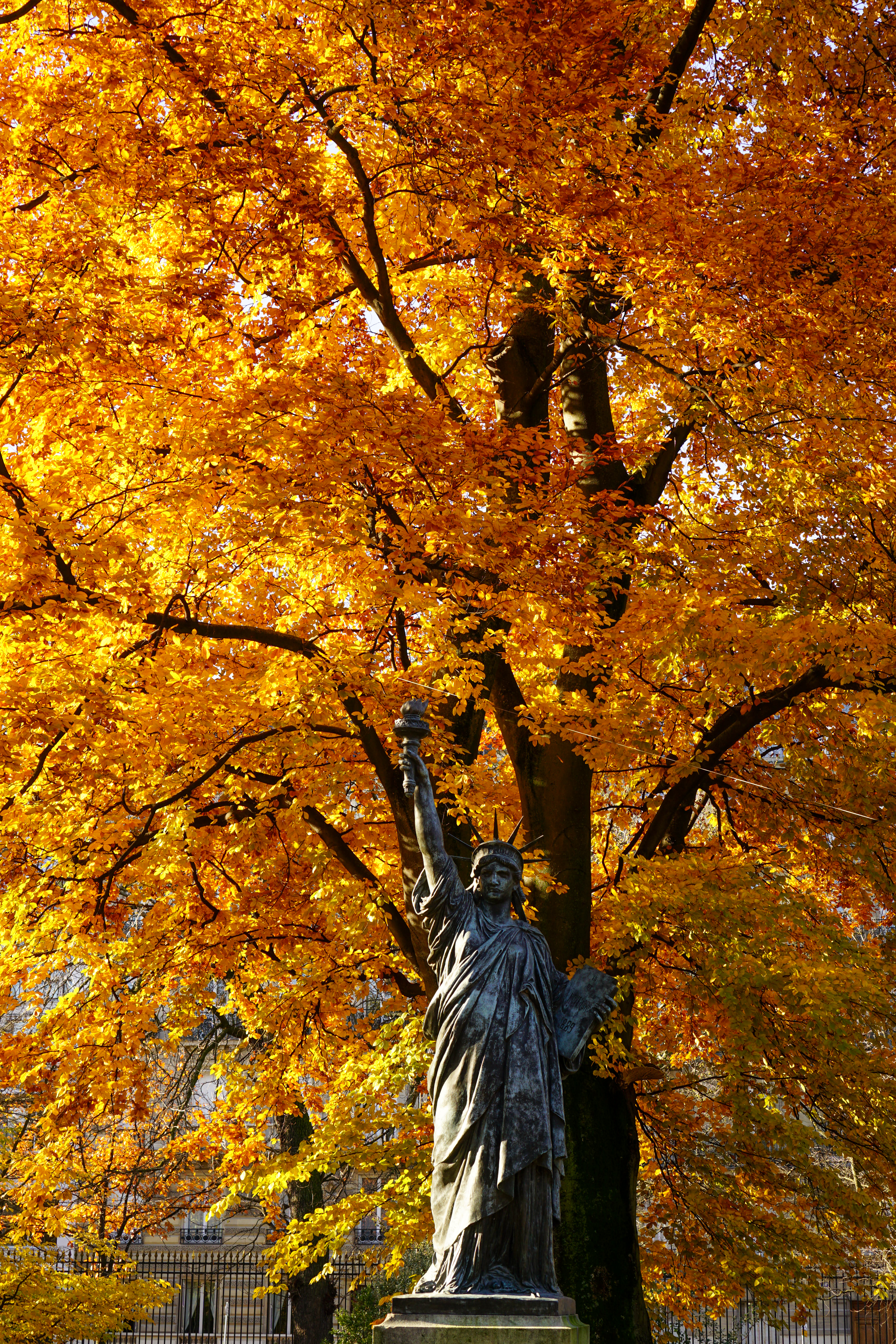
Liberty Enlightening the World in Jardin du Luxembourg in front of an autumnal tree

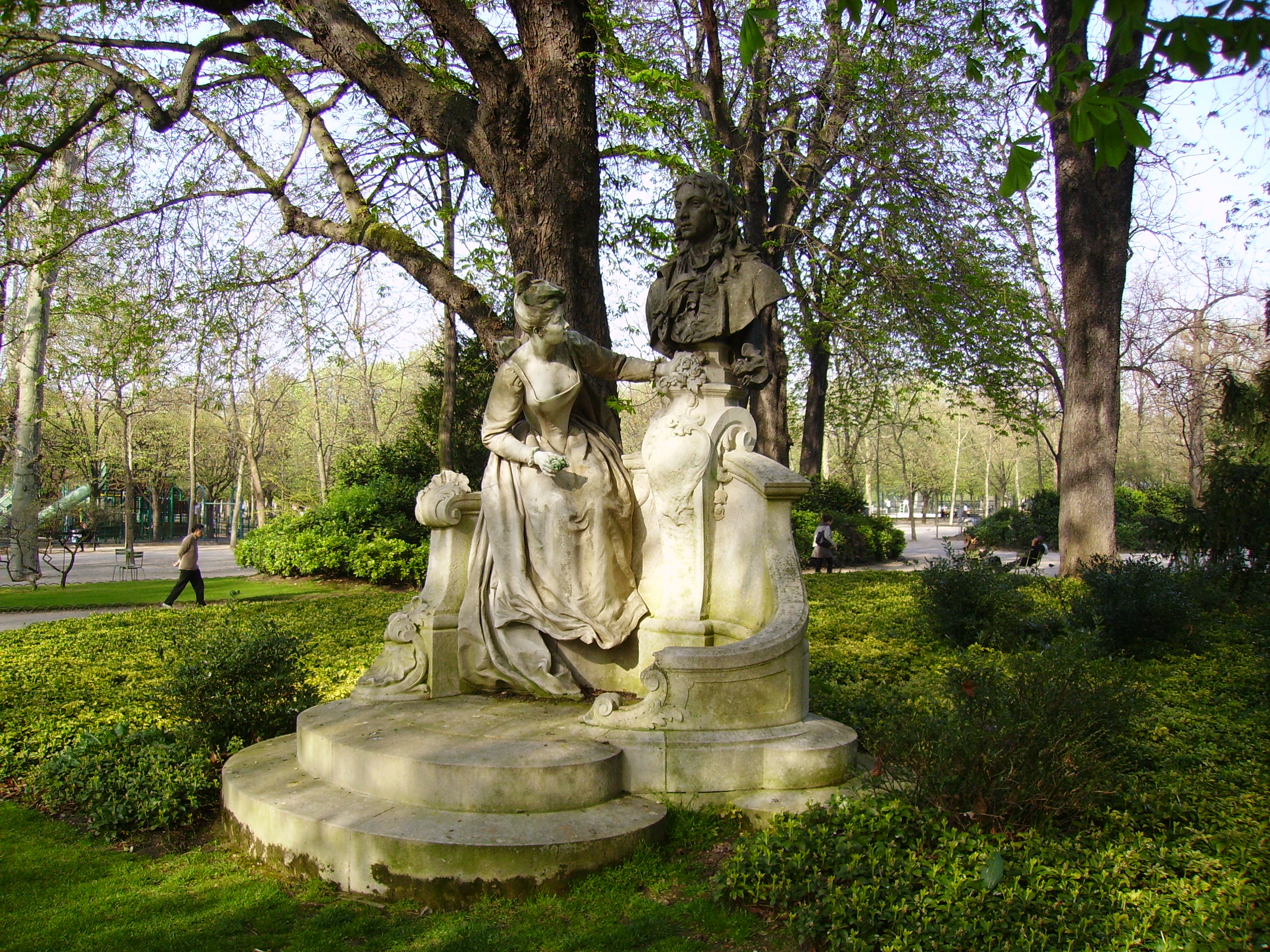
Monument to Jean-Antoine Watteau, by Henri Désiré Gauquié, 1896

Other sculpted work includes:

- Pierre Guillaume Frédéric le Play, by André-Joseph Allar, 1906
- Liberty Enlightening the World, commonly known as the Statue of Liberty, first model, by Frédéric Bartholdi, 1870
- La Bocca della Verità, by Jules Blanchard
- Ludwig van Beethoven, by Antoine Bourdelle, placed here 1978
- Monument to Henri Murger, by Théophile-Henri Bouillon, 1895
- multiple animal sculptures by Auguste Cain
- Le Triomphe de Silène, 1885, Hommage to Delacroix, 1890, and Monument to Auguste Scheurer-Kestner, 1908, both by Jules Dalou
- Monument to Jean-Antoine Watteau, by Henri Désiré Gauquié, 1896
- Narcissus, 1869, and Arion assis sur un dauphin, 1870, both by Ernest-Eugène Hiolle
- Hippomenes by Jean Antoine Injalbert
- Bust of Charles Baudelaire, by Pierre Félix Masseau
- Polyphemus Surprising Acis and Galatea, the Fontaine Médicis, by Auguste Ottin, 1866
- Clémence Isaure by Antoine-Augustin Préault
- Theseus and the Minotaur, by Etienne-Jules Ramey, 1826
- Hercules Diverting the River Alpheus, 1900, and L'Effort, 1902, both by Pierre Roche
- Paul Verlaine, by Rodo (Auguste de Niederhäusern), 1911
- Monument to Édouard Branly, by Charles Marie Louis Joseph Sarrabezolles
- George Sand, by François-Léon Sicard, 1904
- Jules Massenet, by Raoul Verlet, 1926
- Marshal Ney, by François Rude (sculptor) and Alphonse de Gisors (pedestal), 1853.

== Medici Fountain ==
The Medici Fountain (La fontaine Médicis) was built in 1630 by Marie de' Medici, the widow of King Henri IV and regent of King Louis XIII. It was designed by Tommaso Francini, a Florentine fountain maker and hydraulic engineer who was brought from Florence to France by Henri IV. It was in the form of a grotto, a popular feature of the Italian Renaissance garden. It fell into ruins during the 18th century, but in 1811, at the command of Napoleon Bonaparte, the fountain was restored by Jean-François Chalgrin, the architect of the Arc de Triomphe. In 1864–66, the fountain was moved to its present location, centered on the east front of the Palais du Luxembourg. The long basin of water was built and flanked by plane trees, and the sculptures of the giant Polyphemus surprising the lovers Acis and Galatea, by French classical sculptor Auguste Ottin, were added to the grotto's rockwork.

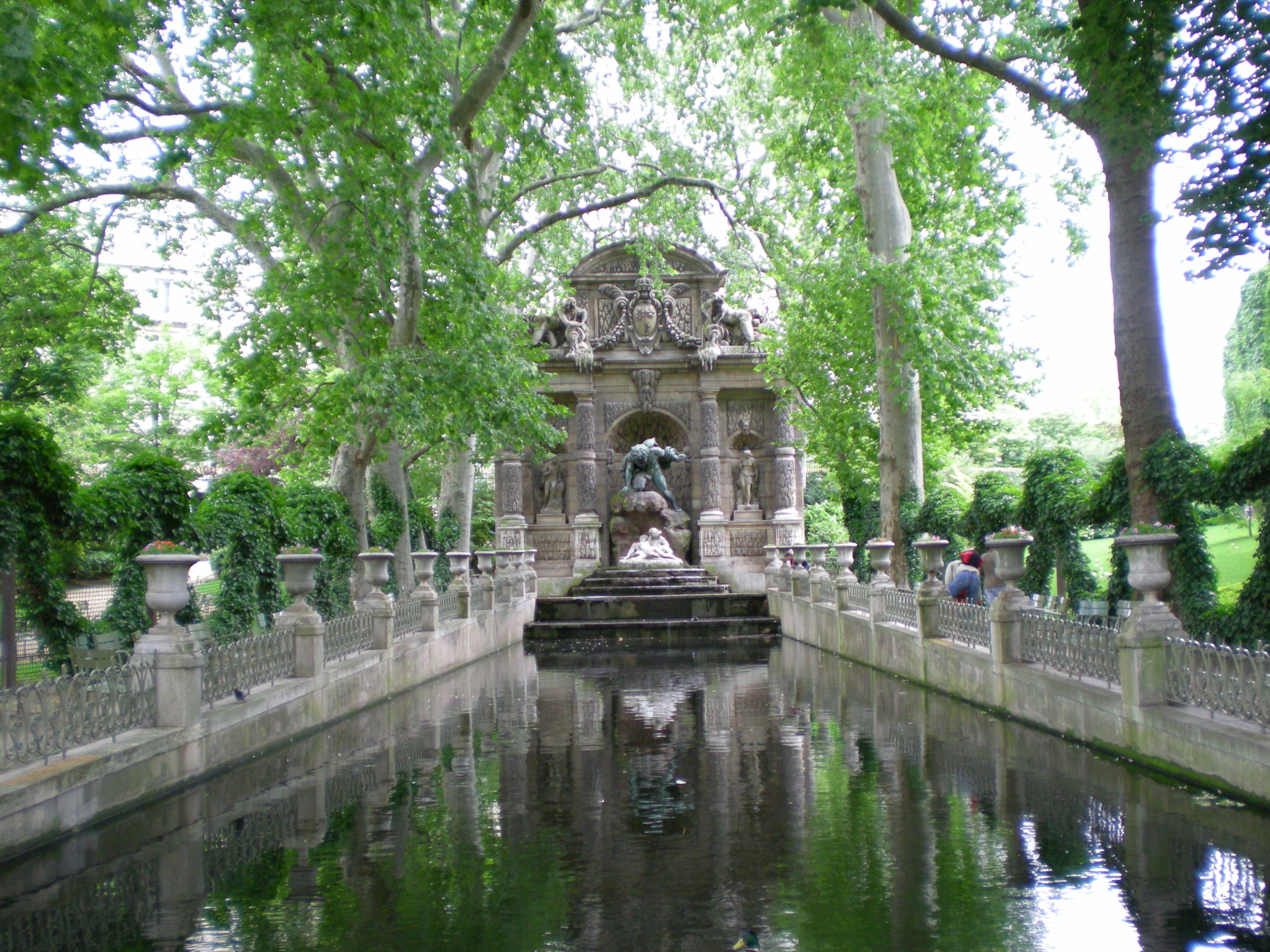
The Medici Fountain (1630, 1866)

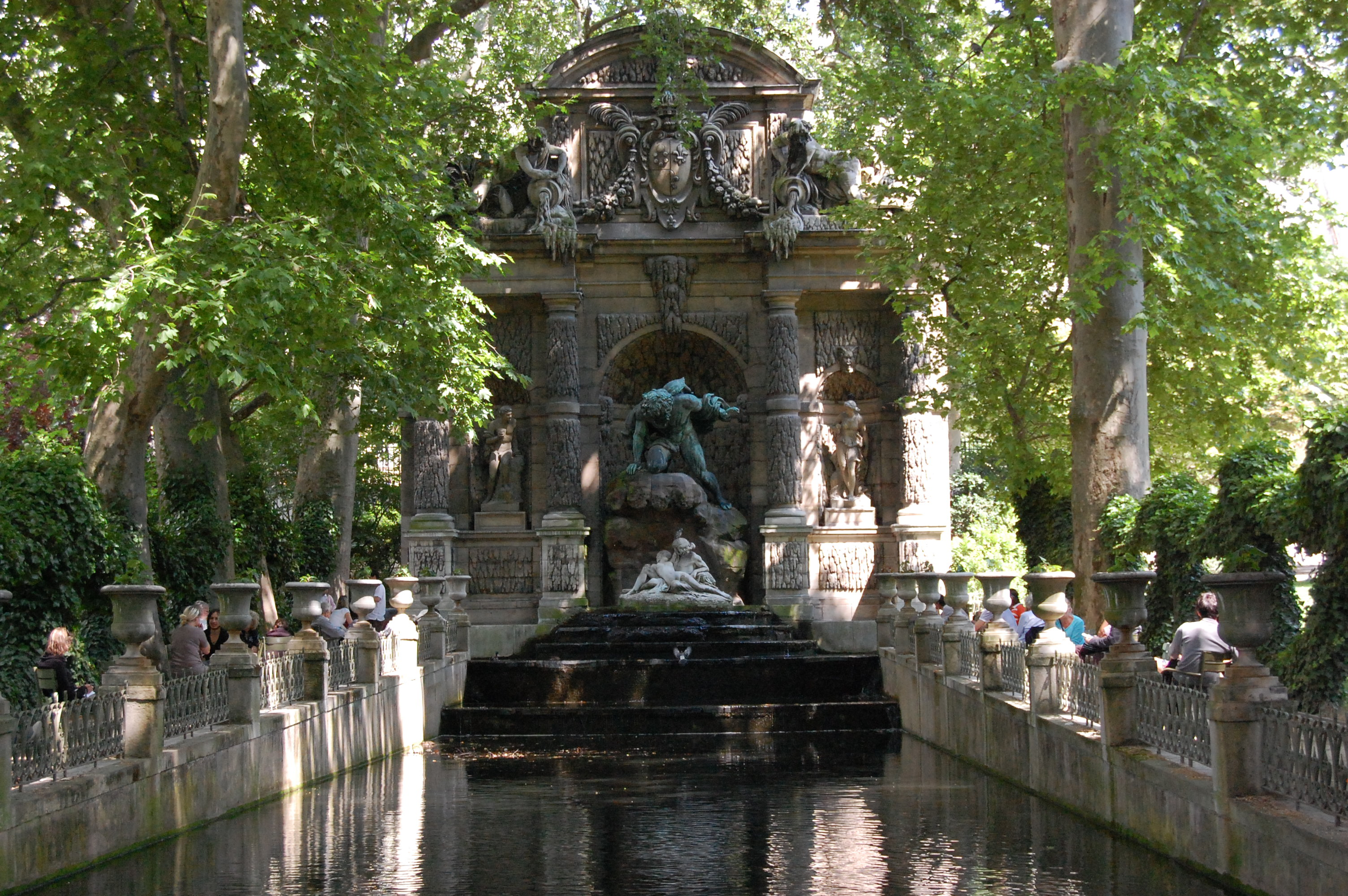
A closeup of the Fontaine de Medicis, Jardin du Luxembourg, Paris.

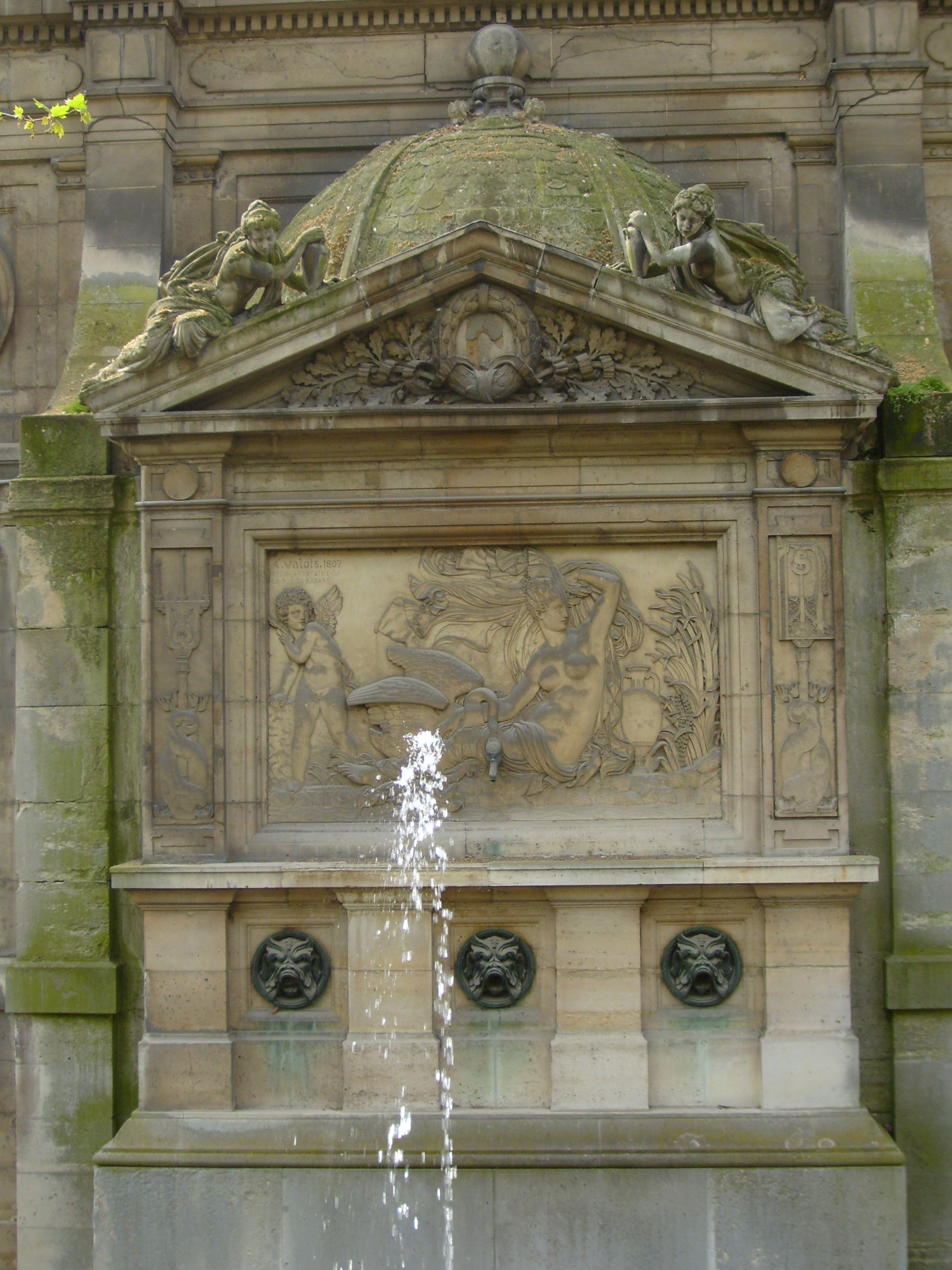
Fontaine de Léda, (1807), hidden behind the Medici Fountain

Hidden behind the Medici Fountain is the Fontaine de Léda, (1807), a wall fountain built during the time of Napoleon Bonaparte at the corner of the Rue du Regard and Rue de Vaugirard, with a bas-relief sculpture depicting the legend of Leda and the Swan by Achille Valois. When the original site was destroyed during the extension of the Rue de Rennes in 1856 by Napoleon III, the fountain was preserved and moved in 1866 to the Luxembourg Gardens and attached to the back of the Medici Fountain.

== In popular culture ==
The gardens are featured prominently in Victor Hugo's novel Les Misérables. It is here that the principal love story of the novel unfolds, as the characters Marius Pontmercy and Cosette first meet. Several scenes of André Gide's novel The Counterfeiters also take place in the gardens.

Henry James also uses the gardens, in The Ambassadors, as the place in which his character Lambert Strether has an epiphany about his identity. The final scene of William Faulkner's novel Sanctuary is set in the gardens. Patrick Modiano heard the news he had won the 2014 Nobel Prize in Literature via a mobile phone call from his daughter while he was walking through Paris "just next to the Jardin du Luxembourg".

Non-literary references include as the setting for a few episodes of French in Action, the 10th Joe Dassin's 1976 studio album Le Jardin du Luxembourg, the cover of Tame Impala's 2012 album Lonerism, the title of a song by the band The Ghost of a Saber Tooth Tiger and the gardens and palace being added as a mission in the video game Assassin's Creed Unity.

== Images ==
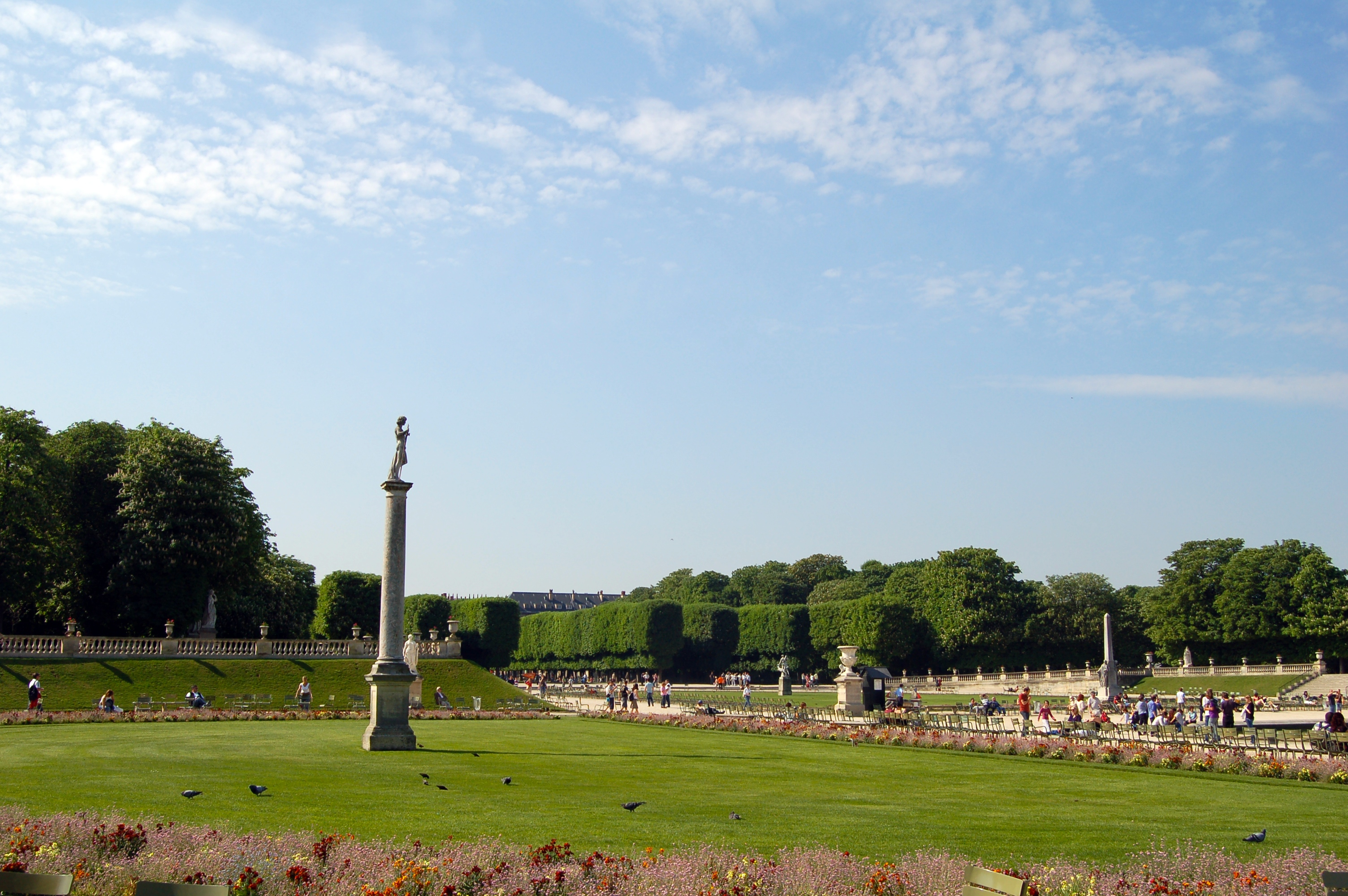
Gardens in front of the Palais du Luxembourg

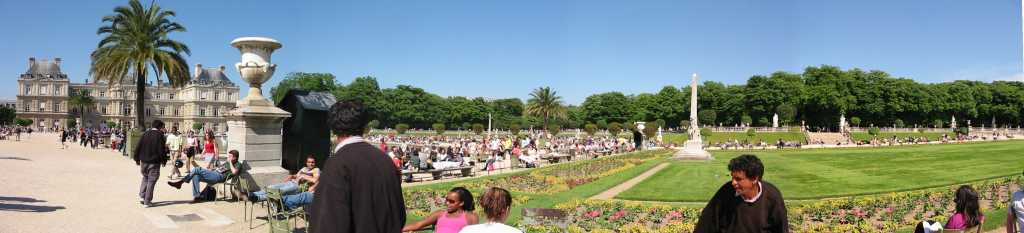
Panoramic view of the Jardin du Luxembourg

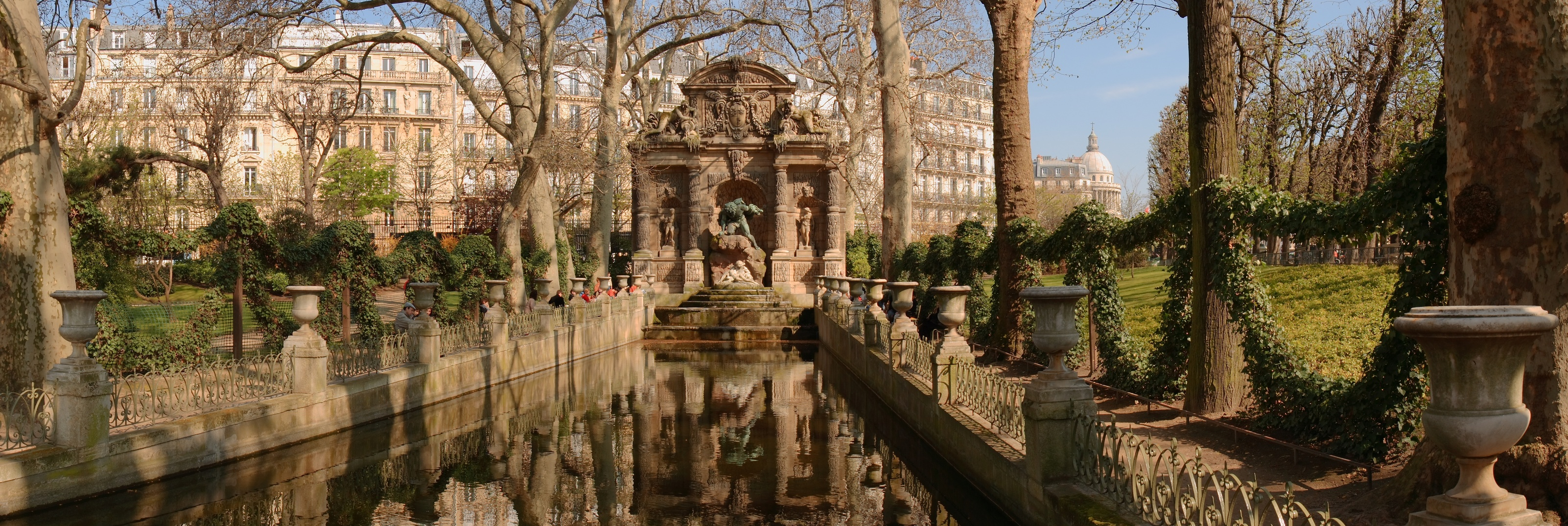
Marie de Médicis' fountain, now with Polyphemus Surprising Acis and Galatea, by Auguste Ottin (1866)

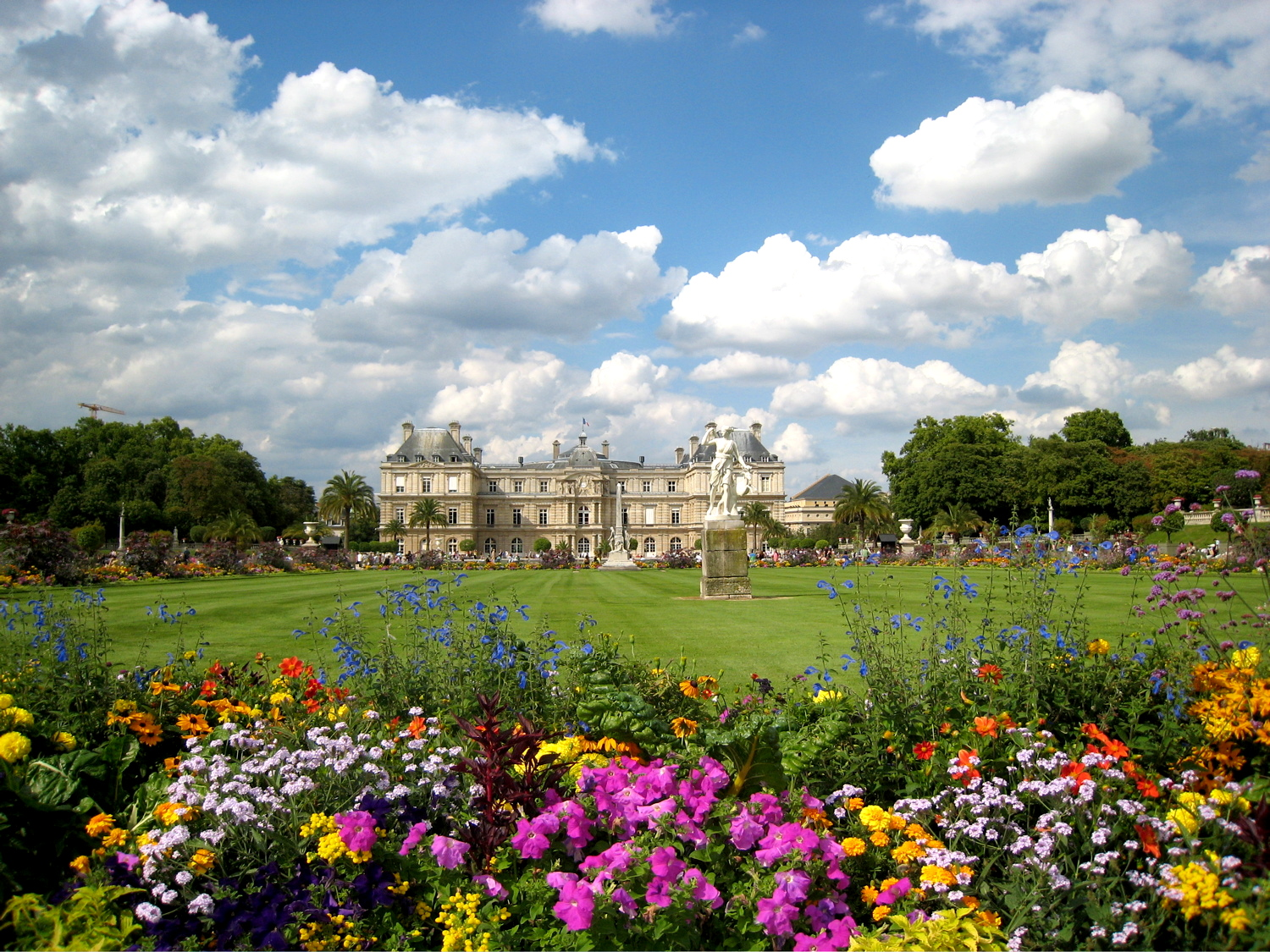
Borders of annuals in August

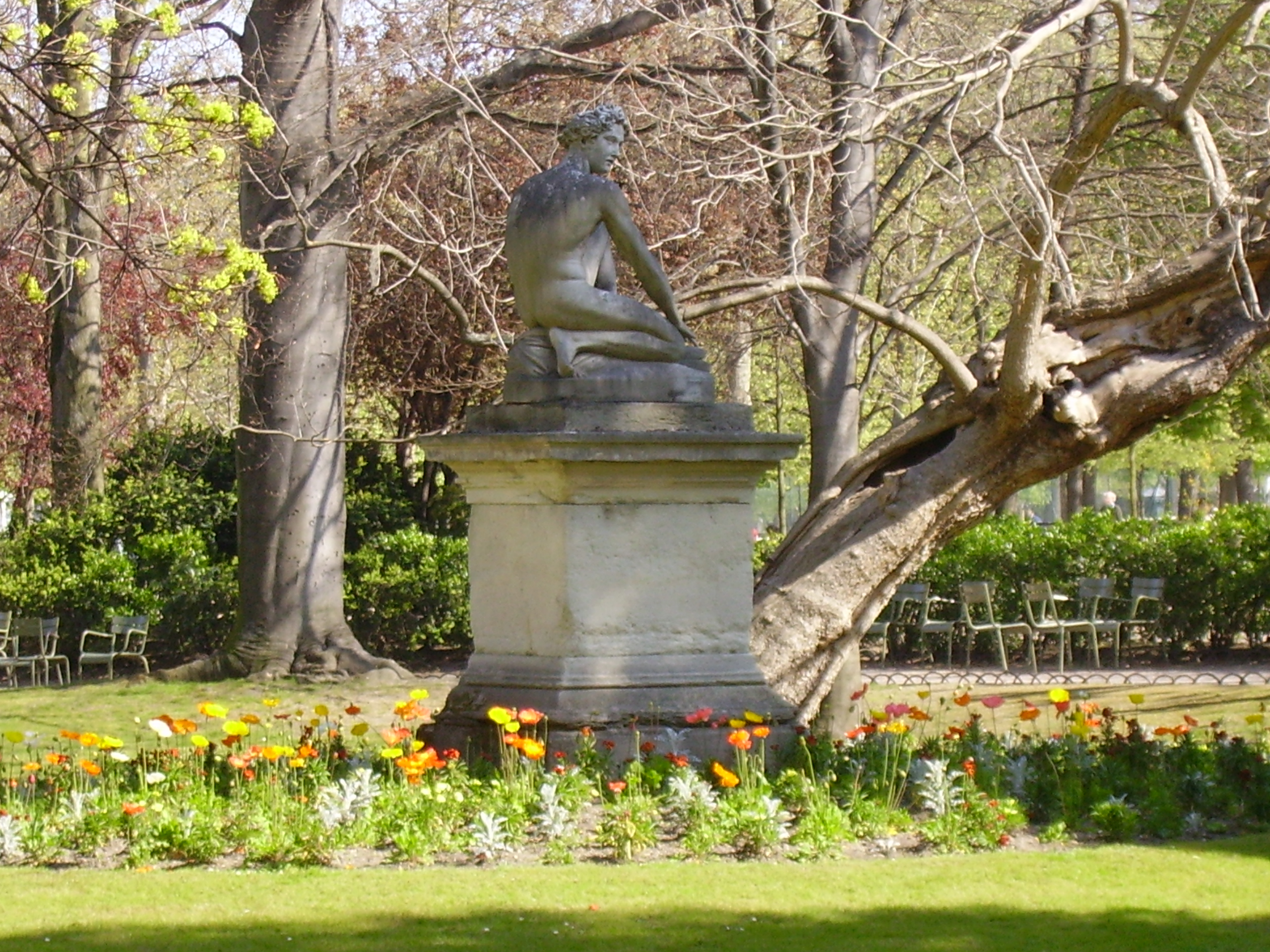
A version of the Arrotino under a beech

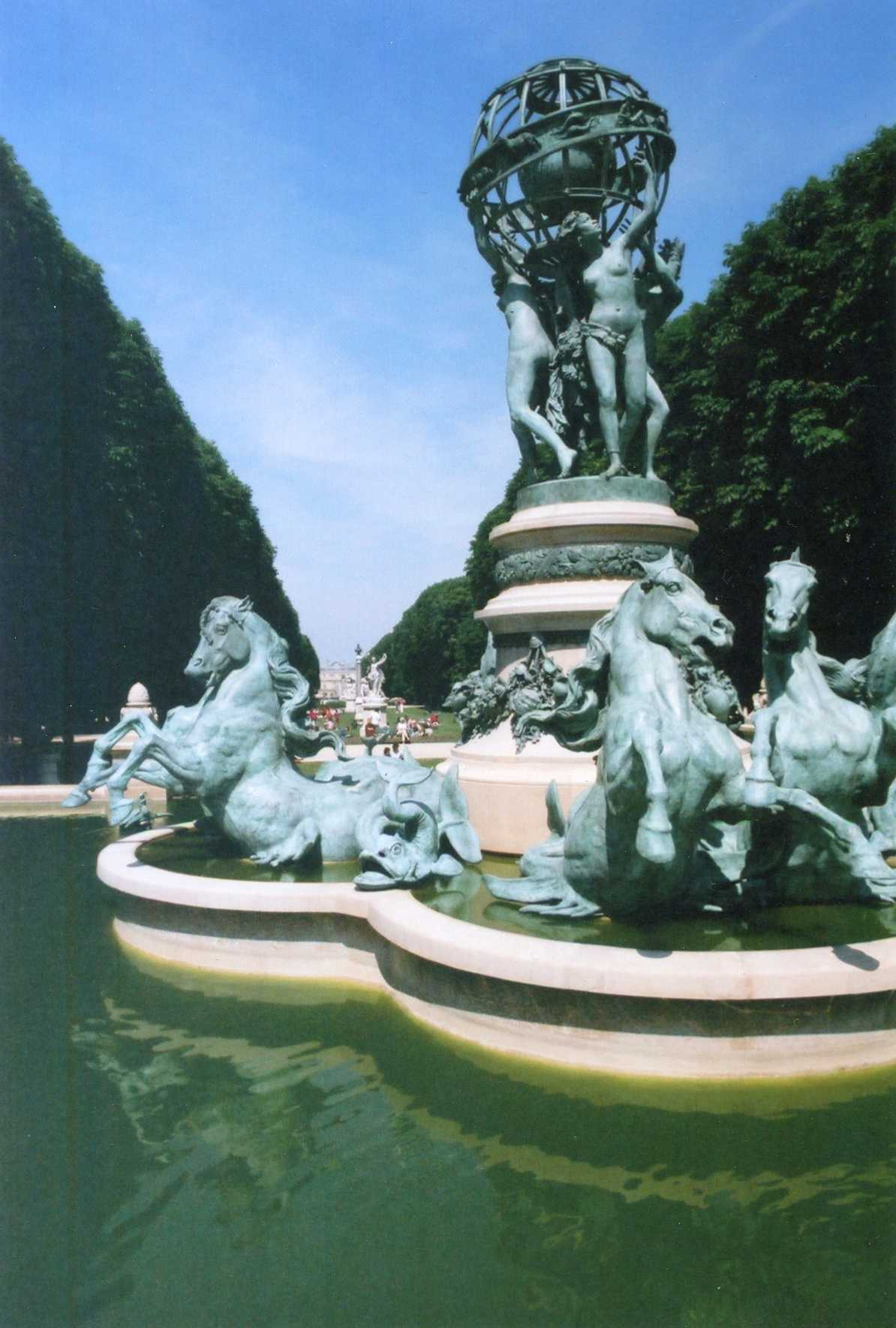
Fontaine de l'Observatoire, at southern end

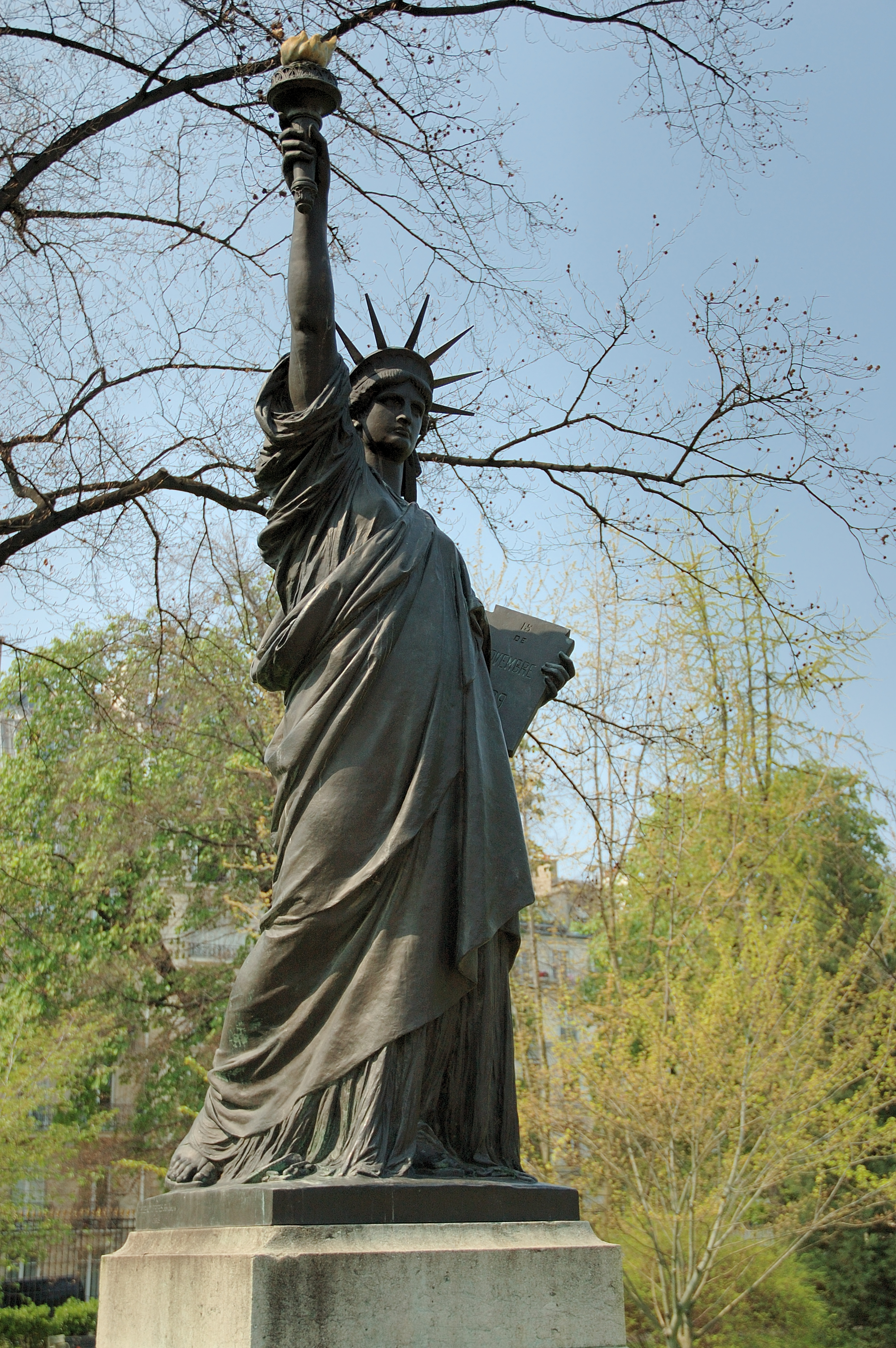
Original model of Liberty Enlightening the World, commonly known as the Statue of Liberty

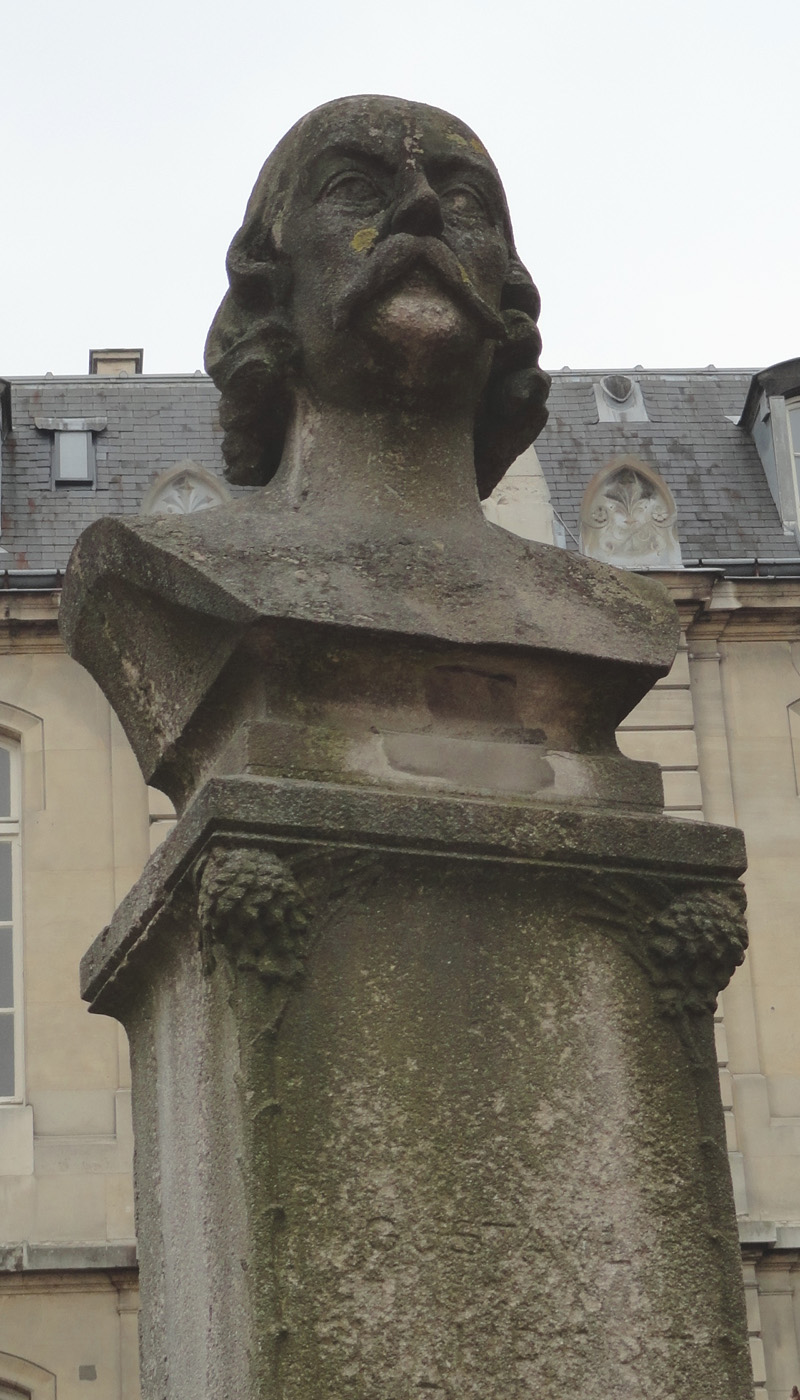
Statue of Gustave Flaubert by Auguste Clésinger

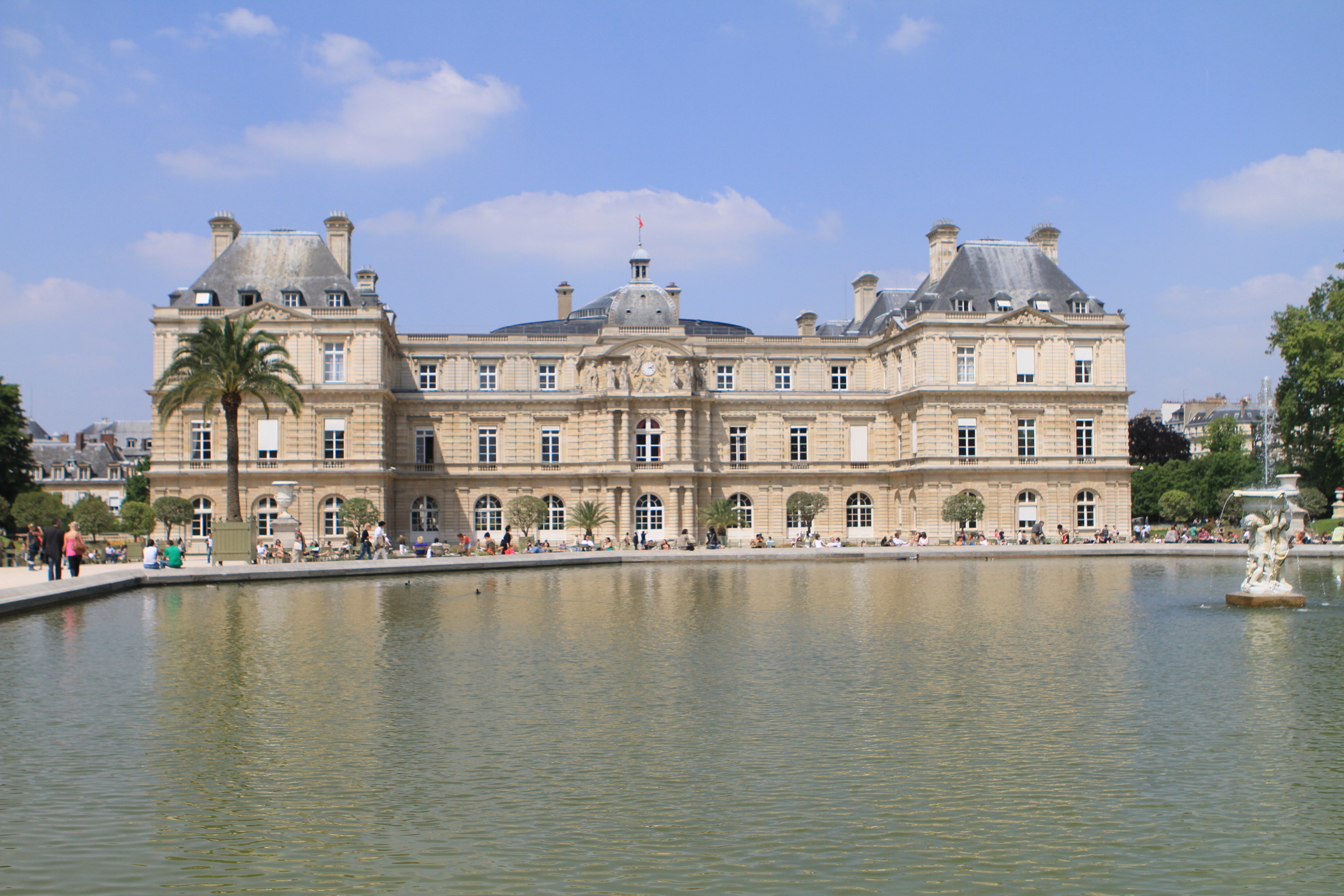
The Pool in front of the Palais de Luxembourg

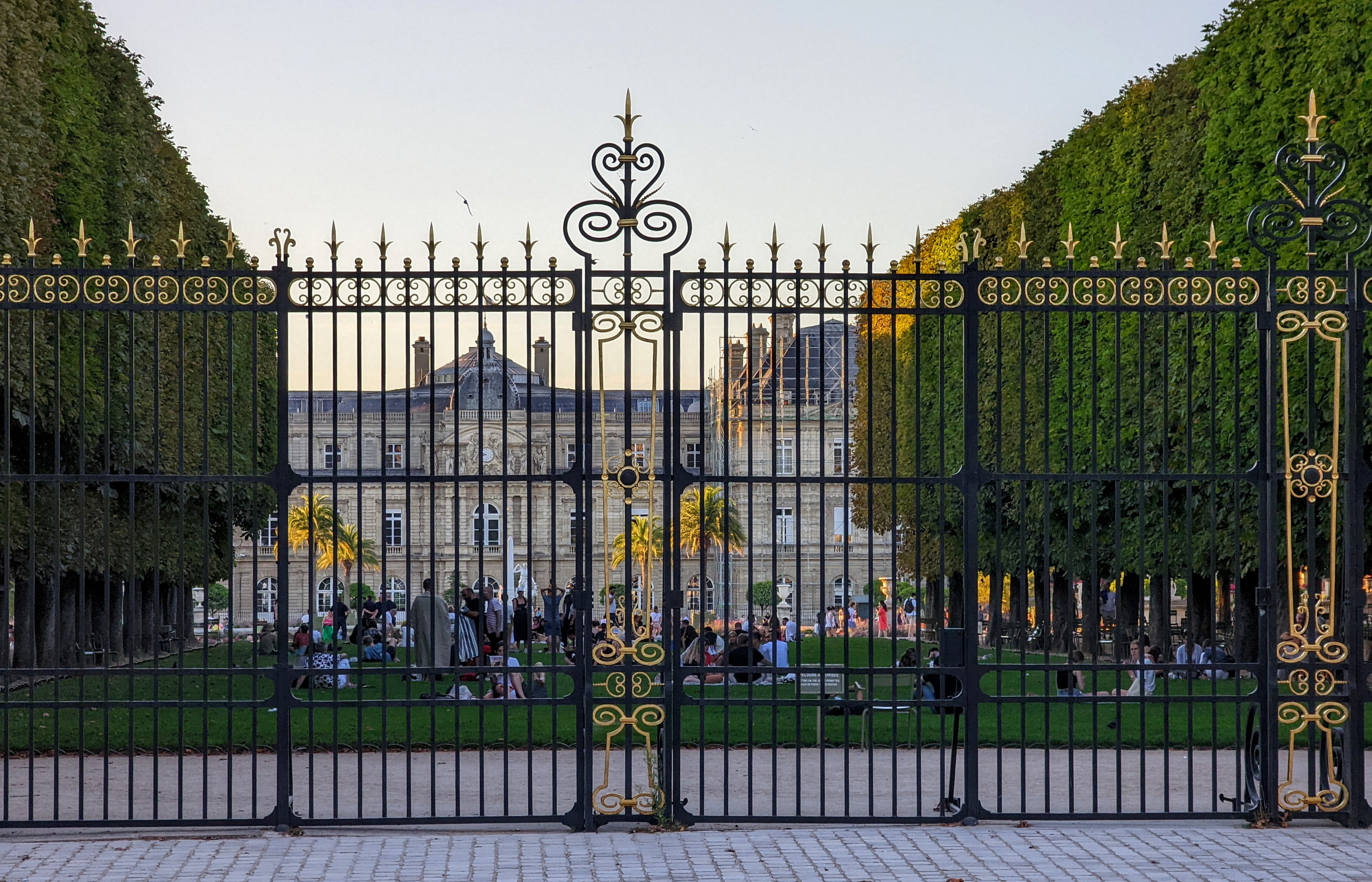
View through the gates on Rue Auguste Compte

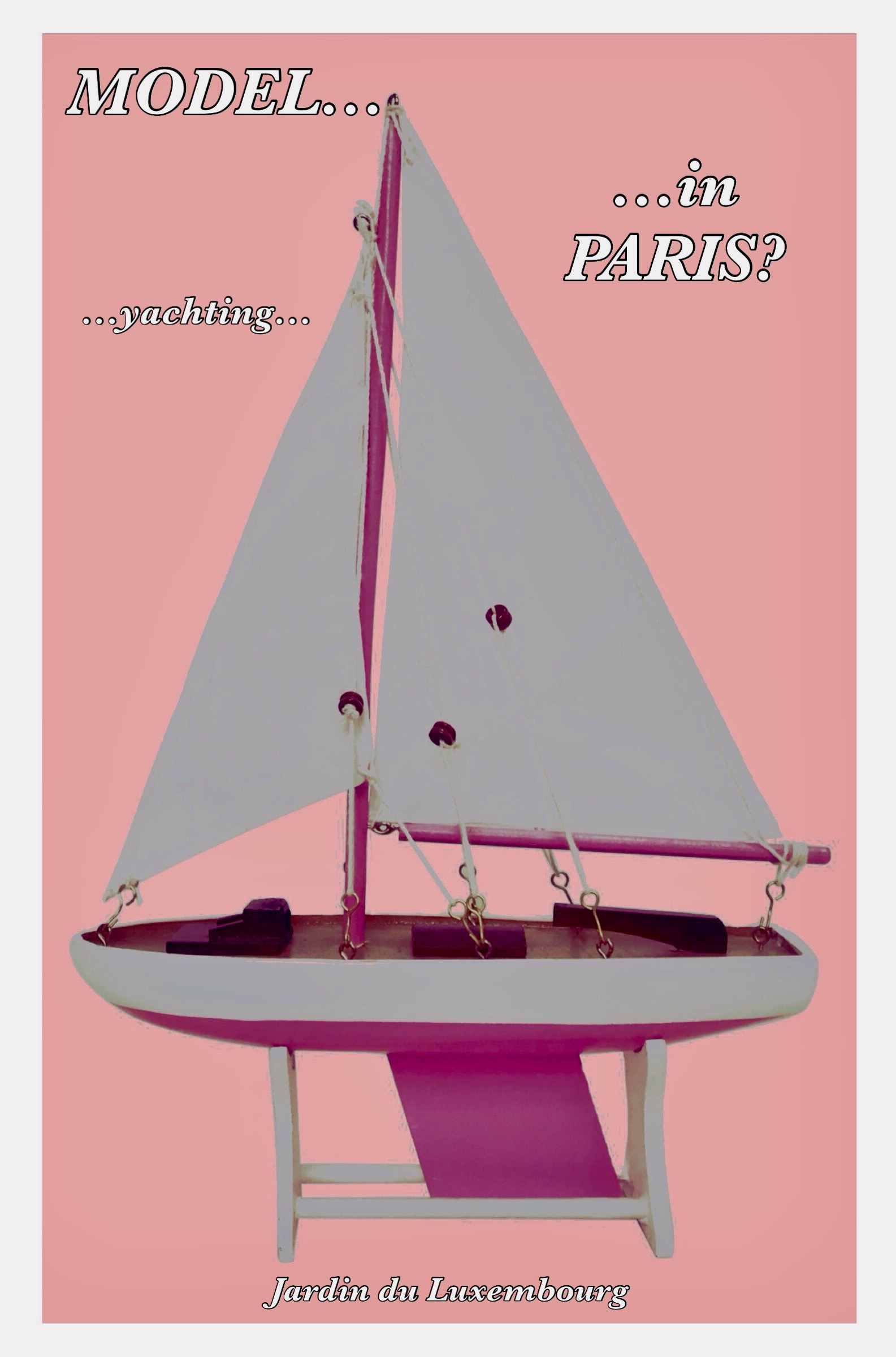
Postcard of Paris. Model yachting in the Jardin du Luxembourg, 2011

== See also ==
- List of parks and gardens in Paris
- Luxembourg station (Paris)
- Orangerie du Sénat
- Musée du Luxembourg

== Bibliography ==
- André Arnold-Peltier and Vassili Karist, Le Jardin du Luxembourg / The Luxembourg gardens, Éditions Pippa, collection Itinérances (ISBN 2-916506-00-4) (photos)
- Paris et ses fontaines, de la Renaissance à nos jours, texts assembled by Dominque Massounie, Pauline-Prevost-Marcilhacy and Daniel Rabreau, Délegation a l'action artistique de la Ville de Paris. from the Collection Paris et son Patrimoine, directed by Beatrice de Andia. Paris, 1995.
- Dominique Jarrassé, Grammaire des Jardins Parisiens, Parigramme, Paris, 2007. (ISBN 978-2-84096-476-6)
