= Musée du Luxembourg =

Art gallery in Paris

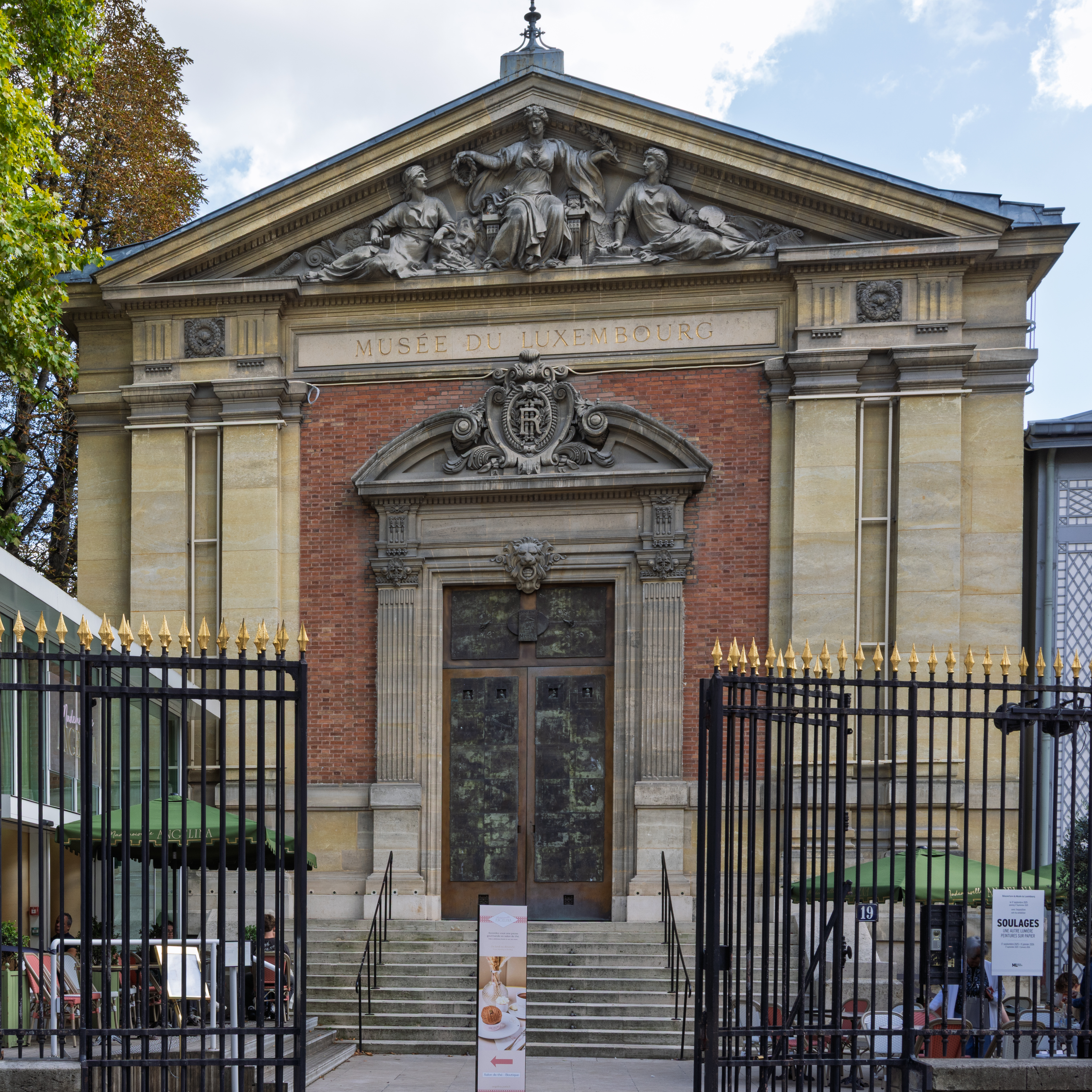
- Façade of the museum

- Location within Paris
- Established: 1750; 276 years ago
- Location: 19 rue de Vaugirard, 75006 Paris, France
- Coordinates: 48.8486°N 2.3340°E
- Type: Temporary exhibitions
- Public transit access: Rennes; Odéon; Luxembourg
- Website: www.museeduluxembourg.fr

The Musée du Luxembourg (French pronunciation: [myze dy lyksɑ̃buʁ]) is a museum at 19 rue de Vaugirard in the 6th arrondissement of Paris. Established in 1750, it was initially an art museum located in the east wing of the Luxembourg Palace (the matching west wing housed the Marie de' Medici cycle by Peter Paul Rubens) and in 1818 became the first museum of contemporary art. In 1884 the museum moved into its current building, the former orangery of the Palace. The museum was taken over by the French Ministry of Culture and the French Senate in 2000, when it began to be used for temporary exhibitions, and became part of the Réunion des Musées Nationaux in 2010.

== History ==
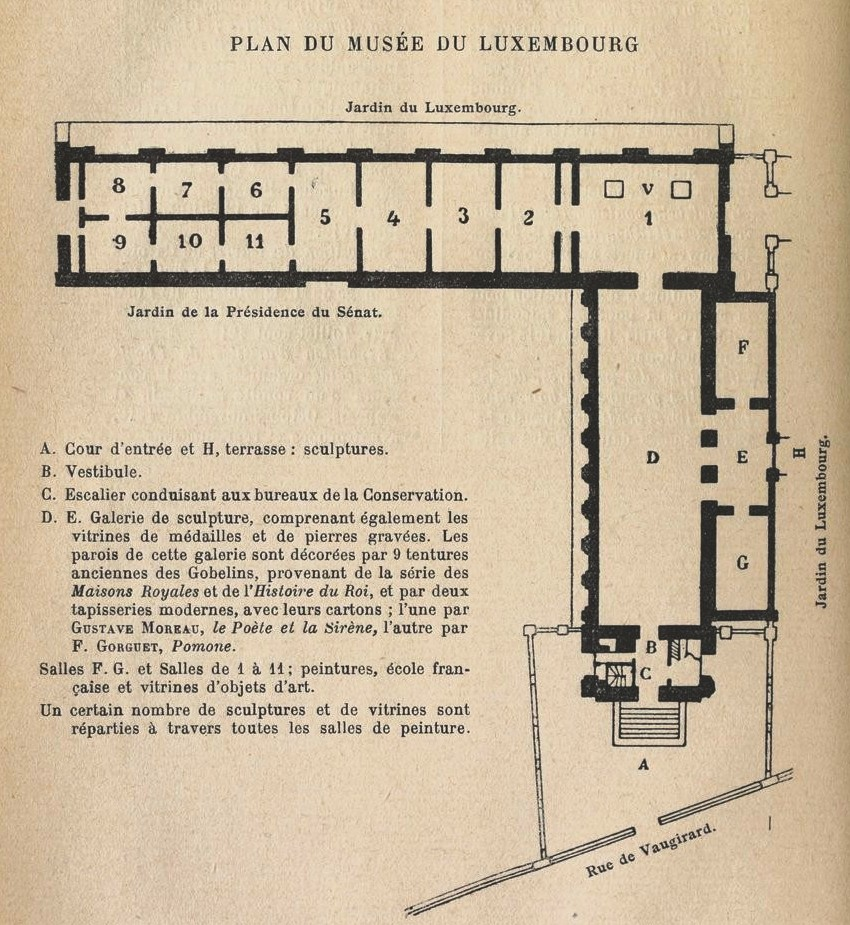
Plan of the museum in 1923

From 1750 to 1780 it was the first public painting gallery in Paris, displaying the King's collection which included Titian's Madonna of the Rabbit, Da Vinci's Holy Family (either The Virgin and Child with St. Anne or Virgin of the Rocks) and nearly a hundred other Old Master works now forming the nucleus of the Louvre. In 1803, the Musée du Luxembourg reopened showing paintings by a range of artists from Nicolas Poussin to Jacques-Louis David. It was then devoted to living artists from 1818 to 1937. Much of the work first shown here has found its way into other museums of Paris including the Jeu de Paume, the Orangerie, and ultimately the Musée National d'Art Moderne and the Musée d'Orsay.

=== Other notable events ===
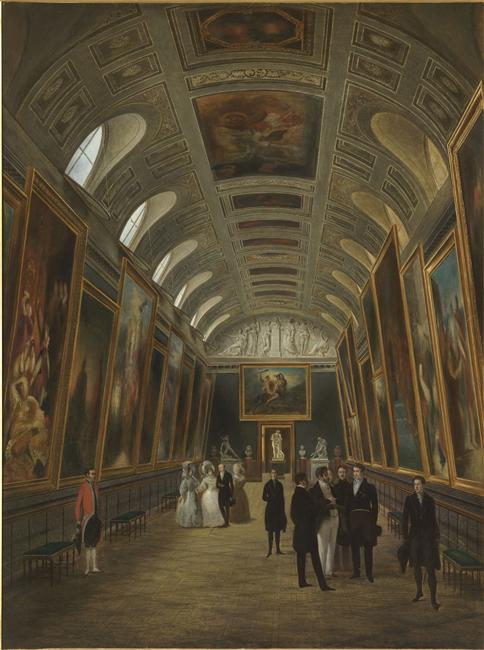
The Luxembourg Museum in the east wing of the Palace, c. 1848

- In 1861, James Tissot showed The Meeting of Faust and Marguerite, which was purchased by the state for the Luxembourg Gallery.
- The illustrator André Gill (1840–1885) was named curator of the Musée du Luxembourg on 15 May 1871, in which capacity he reassembled the scattered collections of art and re-established the museum of sculpture. He had scarcely begun his work when it was interrupted by the upheaval associated with the Paris Commune.
- When Ernest Hemingway visited Gertrude Stein at the nearby rue de Fleurus, he stopped to see the work of the Impressionists which in 1921 were still in the Musée du Luxembourg.
- In 1978 a retrospective of the Ecole de Paris artist, Alexandre Frenel is exhibited in the Orangerie du Senat, inaugurated by the French President of the Senate, Alain Poher; marking the reopening of the museum to the works of living artists. The museum was formally reopened as an art museum by the French Senate in 1979.

== Sources ==
- (in French) Les Grands du Dessin de Press: André Gill (1840-1885) "Quand ouvrira-t-on des maisons pour imbeciles?"
- Ochterbeck, Cynthia Clayton, editor (2009). The Green Guide Paris. Greenville, South Carolina: Michelin Maps and Guides. ISBN 9781906261375.
