= Édouard Herzig =

Édouard Herzig (23 December 1860 – 3 October 1926) was a Swiss painter, drawer and illustrator who lived in French Algeria. He did paintings of Kabylie. He also drew arabesque patterns. He exhibited his work at the Union artistique de l'Afrique du Nord.
