= Orangerie du Sénat =

Coordinates: 48°50′54″N 2°20′4″E

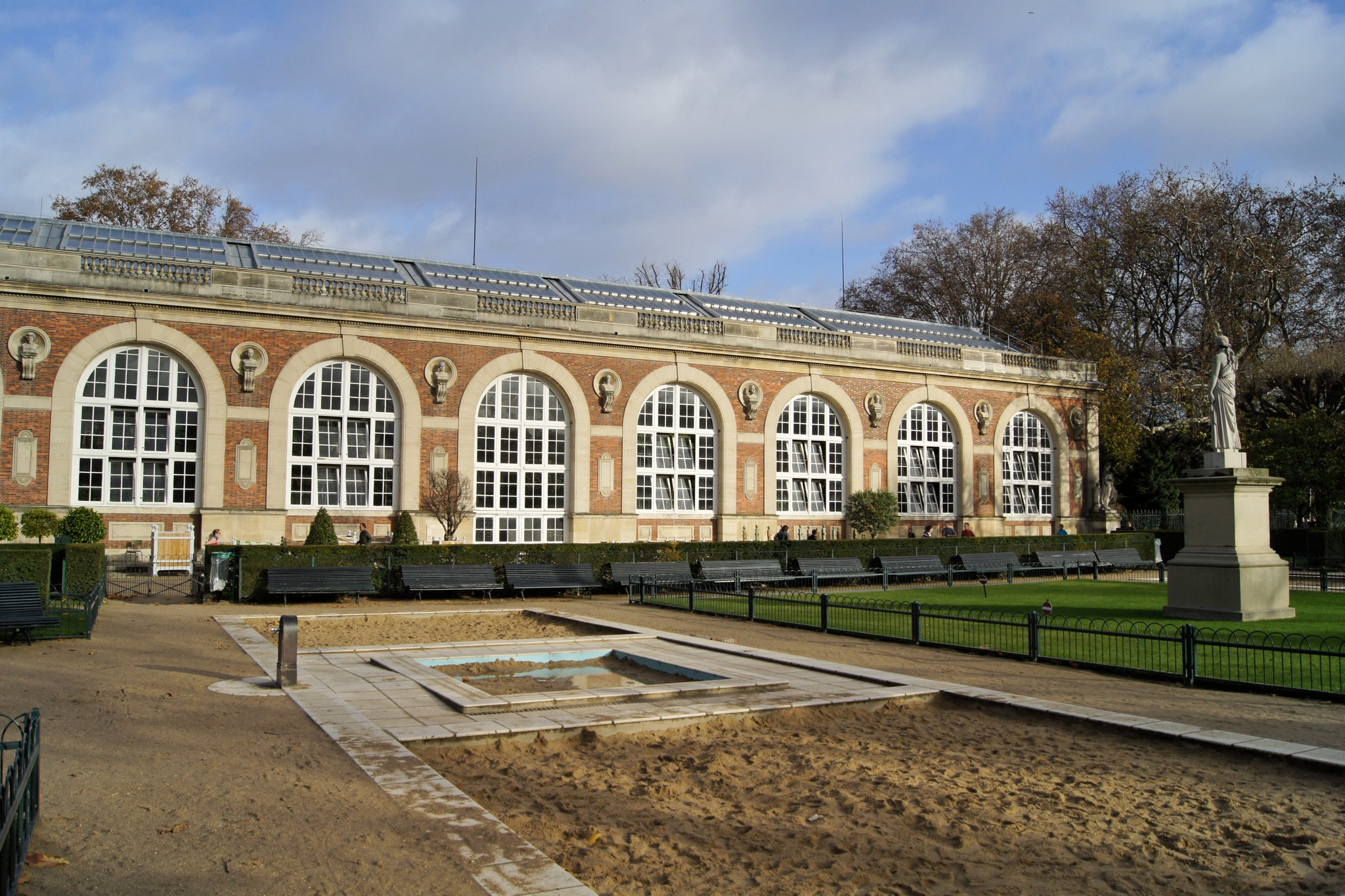
L'orangerie du Senat in the Jardin du Luxembourg in Paris.

The Orangerie du Sénat (the orangery of the French Senate) is an orangery in the Jardin du Luxembourg park in Paris. Until the 1930s the orangerie was used to host art exhibitions. Several orangery buildings have served the Luxembourg Garden since its creation by French queen, Marie de’ Medici. The present building was commissioned in 1836 by the Chamber of Peers and completed in 1839 to designs by architect Alphonse de Gisors. It was built to shelter potted citrus trees during winter and measured about 57 by 15 metres, with large arched windows and side doors for moving the plants.

The Orangerie du Sénat was used for the display of sculpture and modern art (used until the 1930s). In 1978 the orangerie was reused once more as an art exhibition space for a retrospective of the Ecole de Paris painter Alexandre Frenel, inaugurated by Alain Poher, President of the French Senate.

== History ==
Several orangery buildings have served the Luxembourg Garden since its creation by French queen, Marie de’ Medici, during the early 17th century . The building currently used as an orangery was commissioned in 1836 by the Chamber of Peers, the French Upper House and ancestor of the French Senate. The building was completed in 1839 to designs by architect Alphonse de Gisors. It was built to shelter potted citrus trees during winter and measured about 57 by 15 metres, with large arched windows and side doors for moving the plants.

From 1886, the building was used by the Musée du Luxembourg to display artworks. It was enlarged and decorated with busts of artists and sculptures representing painting and sculpture. After the creation of the Musée national d’art moderne in 1937, the orangery returned to its horticultural use after the Second World War. It now shelters about 180 container plants and also hosts exhibitions.

In 1978 the orangerie was reused once more as an art exhibition space for a major retrospective of the Odesa born painter Alexandre Frenel, a School of Paris painter. The exhibition was inaugurated by Alain Poher, President of the French Senate.

== Gallery ==
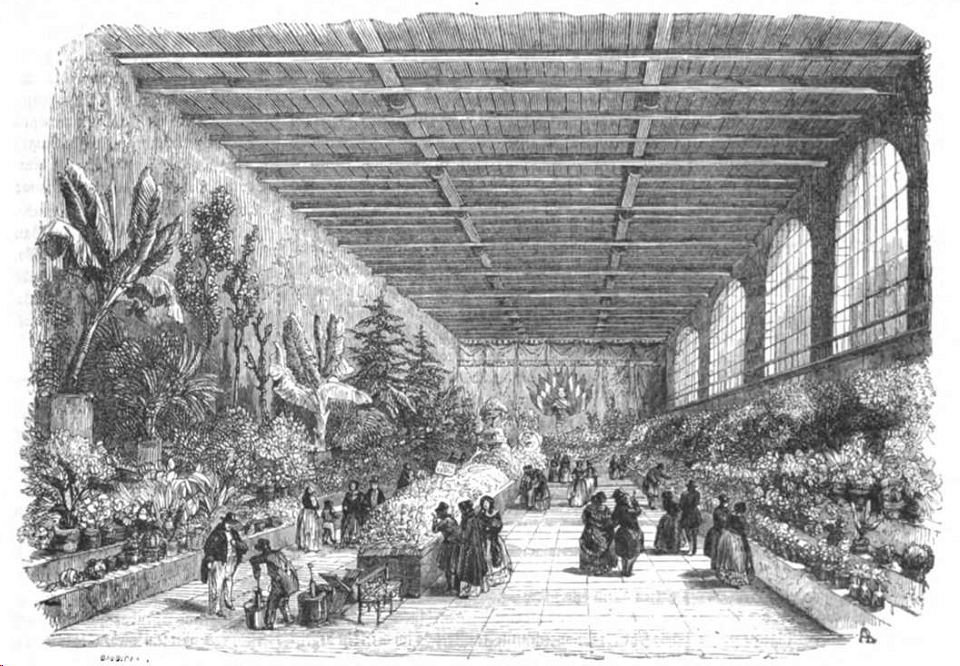
Botanic exhibition in the Orangerie du Sénat in 1843.

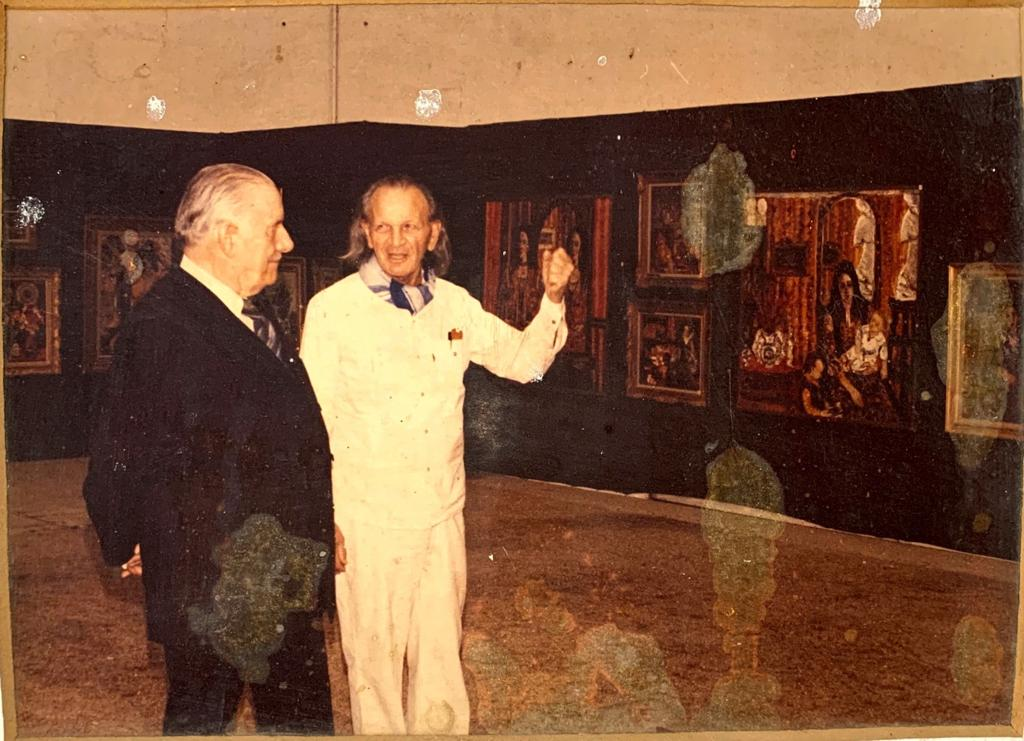
The painter Alexandre Frenel to the right with the President of the French Senate, Alain Poher to the left in a retrospective exhibition in 1978.

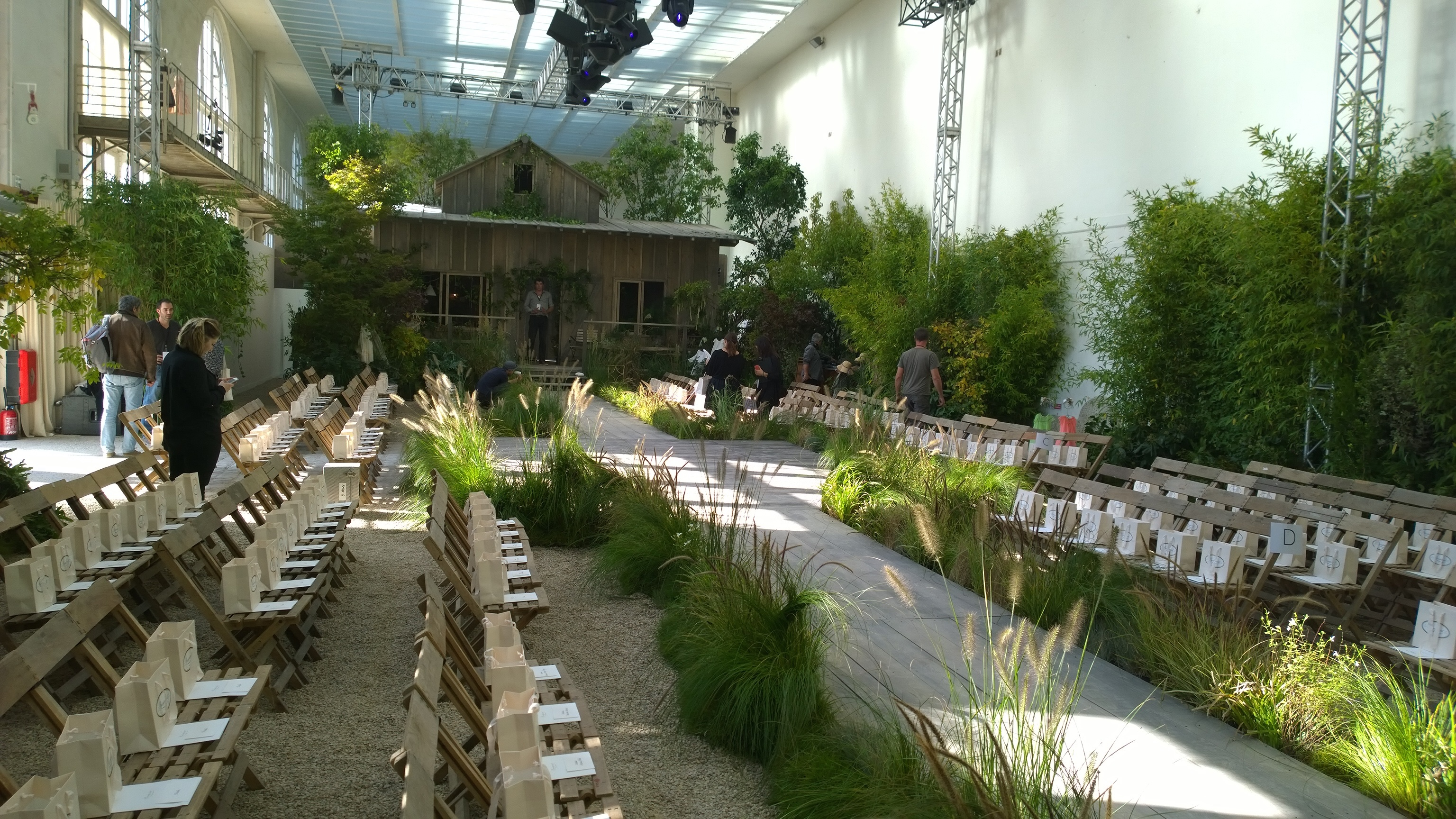
Panoramio exhibition in the Orangerie du Sénat, 2015
