= Hôtel-Lamoignon - Mark Ashton Garden =

Urban park in Paris, France

Coordinates: 48°51′25″N 2°21′44″E

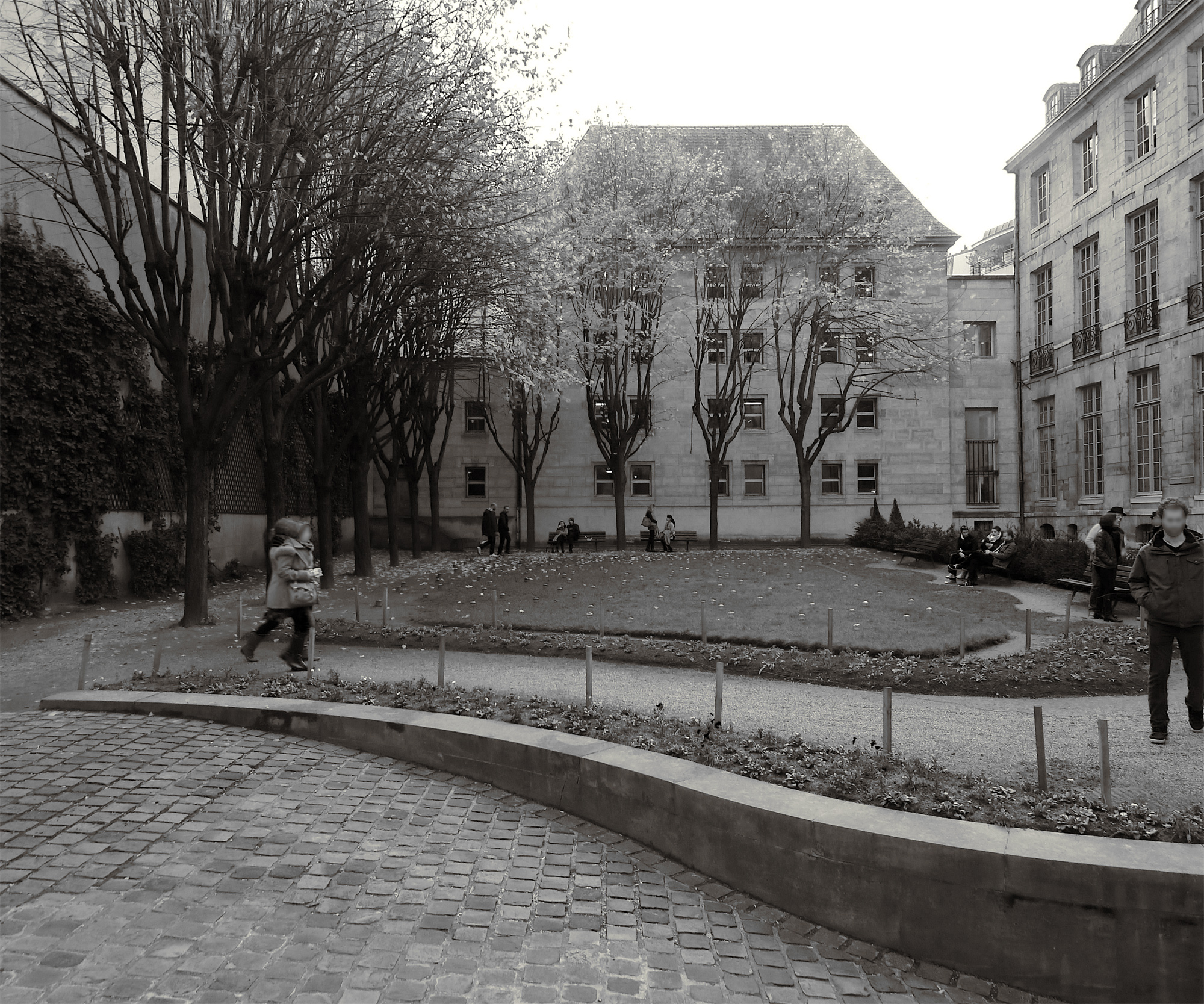
Mark Ashton Garden and the Bibliothèque Historique de la Ville de Paris

The Hôtel-Lamoignon – Mark-Ashton Garden (French: Jardin de l'Hôtel-Lamoignon – Mark-Ashton), is a green space located in the 4th arrondissement of Paris next to the Hôtel de Lamoignon.

== Location ==
The garden is located at the address 25 rue des Francs-Bourgeois, next to the Hôtel de Lamoignon, which houses the Bibliothèque Historique de la Ville de Paris, in the heart of the historic quarter of Le Marais. It can be accessed either by the hôtel or from the rue des Francs-Bourgeois.

This site is serviced by the Saint-Paul Metro Station.

== Origins of the name ==
The garden takes its name after young British LGBT-activist and Young Communist League general secretary Mark Ashton (1960–1987), by vote of the Council of Paris.

== Description ==
The garden was formerly the property of the Hôtel d'Angoulême Lamoignon mansion.

It is now public place in the center of Le Marais, becoming also a memorial to people who have died from AIDS.

== History ==
The public garden was created in 1969, being a dependence of the Bibliothèque historique de la ville de Paris and officially named and inaugurated in 2018, on December 1, during Parisian events of World AIDS Day.

== Annexes ==
- "Jardin de l'Hôtel-Lamoignon - Mark-Ashton". Mairie de Paris. Archived from the original on 2018-11-07.

== See also ==
- List of parks and gardens in Paris
- 4th arrondissement of Paris
- Le Marais
- Mark Ashton
- Bibliothèque historique de la ville de Paris
- Hôtel d'Angoulême Lamoignon
