= Hôtel de Lamoignon =

16th-century grand house in Paris, France

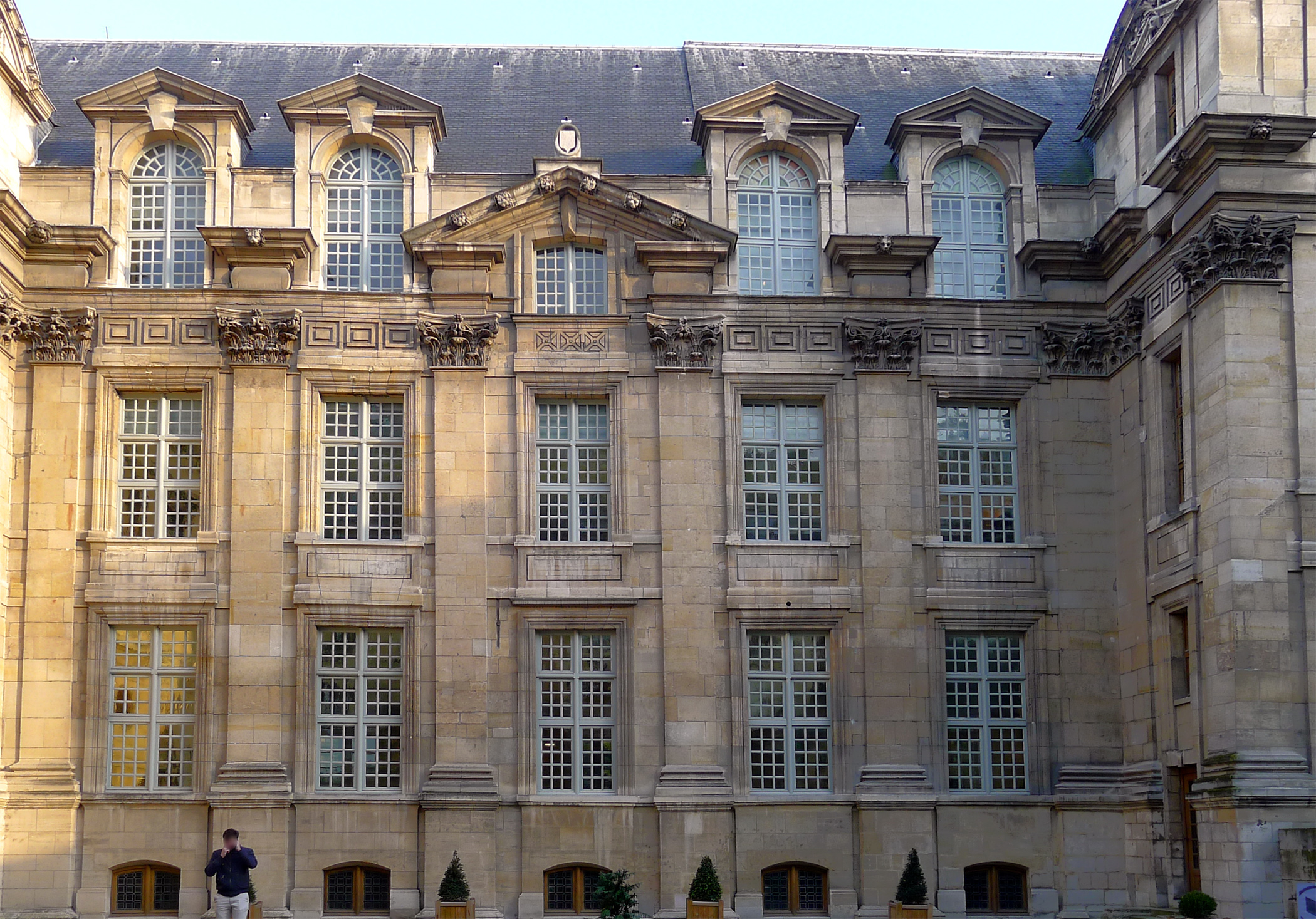
- Courtyard facade
- Interactive map of the Hôtel de Lamoignon area
- Former names: Hôtel d'Angoulême
- Alternative names: Hôtel Lamoignon; Hôtel d'Angoulême-Lamoignon

General information
- Type: Hôtel particulier
- Location: 24, rue Pavée, Paris, France
- Coordinates: 48°51′25″N 2°21′43″E
- Construction started: 1585
- Completed: 1589

Design and construction
- Architect: Thibault Métezeau

Website
- Bibliothèque historique de la Ville de Paris (BHVP)

The Hôtel de Lamoignon (French pronunciation: [otɛl də lamwaɲɔ̃]), earlier the Hôtel d'Angoulême (French pronunciation: [otɛl dɑ̃ɡulɛm]), is a late 16th-century hôtel particulier, or grand townhouse, in the Marais district of the 4th arrondissement of Paris, France. It is the best-preserved house from this period in Paris. Since 1969 it has been the home of the Bibliothèque Historique de la Ville de Paris and its garden, Hôtel-Lamoignon - Mark Ashton Garden, is opened to the public.

== History and description ==
The lot of the hôtel is located outside the limits of medieval Paris, north of the wall of Philip Augustus. In the second quarter of the 16th century, under the influence of Francis I, the royal Hôtel Saint-Pol and its gardens were divided into lots, and, after 1543, constructed upon. A vigorous movement of construction of hôtels particuliers and wealthy townhouses followed in the Saint-Paul quarter, which set up the Marais as the Parisian neighbourhood most favoured by the high nobility.

=== Construction by Diane de France ===
Diane de France, legitimised daughter of Henry II of France and his young mistress Filippa Duci, was created Duchess of Angoulême in 1582. Her new title brought with it considerable wealth, and, when in 1584 she inherited a large lot near the intersection of the rue des Francs-Bourgeois and the rue Pavée in the Marais district, she decided to use it as the location of her main urban residence. Construction of the Hôtel d'Angoulême began in 1584, but was likely interrupted by the Wars of Religion, and only completed by a second phase of construction in 1611. Its architect is still uncertain: long attributed to Baptiste Androuet du Cerceau on stylistic grounds, an archival discovery of 1984 led some historians to name Louis Métezeau as the architect. It is now suggested that Louis' father, Thibault Métezeau, more likely designed it. Another hypothesis suggests Philibert Delorme built the hôtel a little earlier in the century.

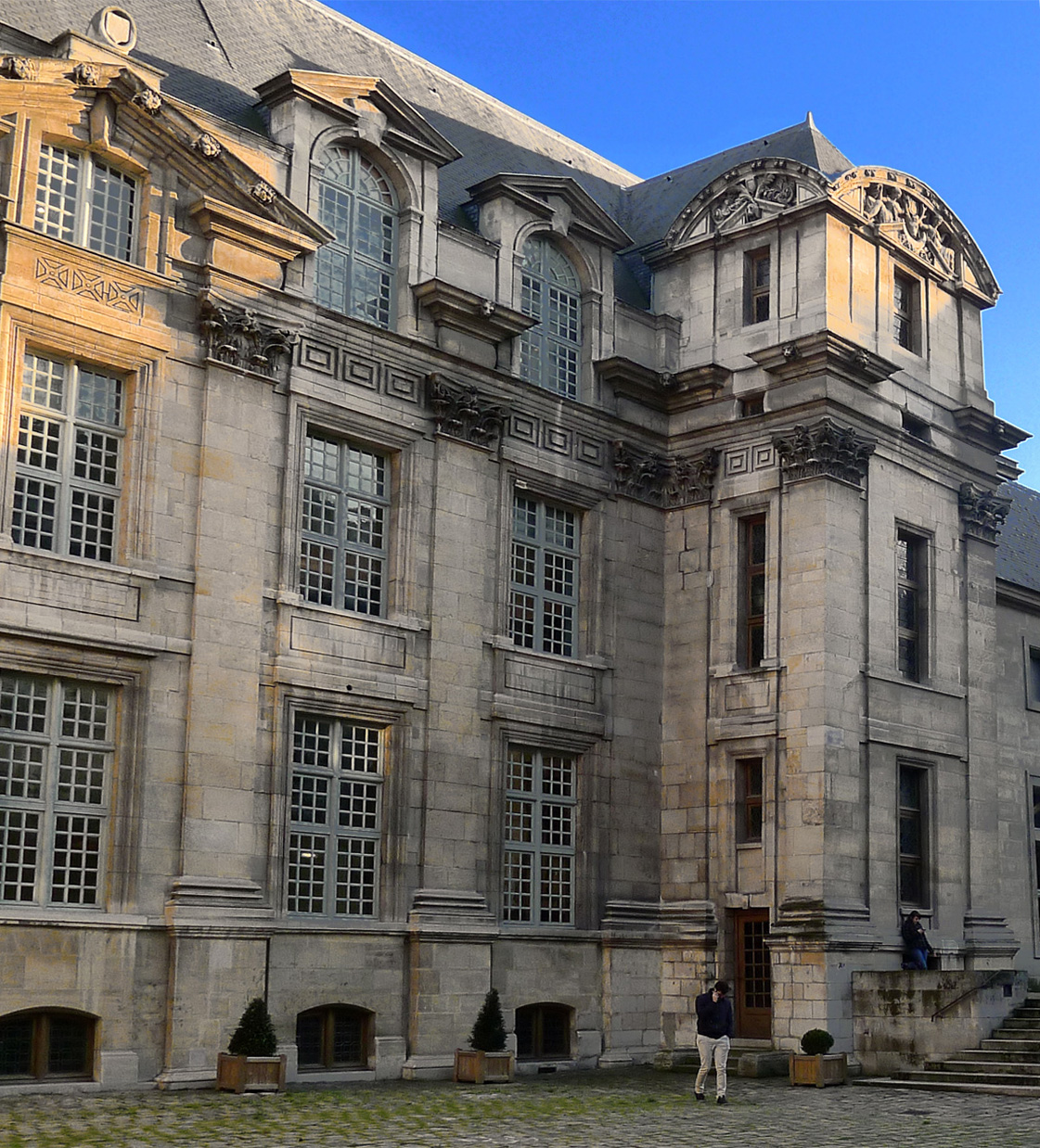
Southern half of the courtyard facade with the south pavilion

The house stood between its entrance courtyard to the west and its garden to the east, a layout reminiscent of a small château. The courtyard facade, richly ornamented and precisely designed, comprised a corps de logis four storeys in height with five bays and two end pavilions. It is the only part of the house to survive more or lesasat it was originally built. The hôtel was among the first in France to use Corinthian pilasters based on the writings of Vitruvius, translated in 1567, a few years before, by Daniele Barbaro. The use of the giant order for these pilasters, then an unusual feature for an hôtel particulier, aims to give the facade a majestic appearance, fitting and expressing the social dignity of its royal inhabitants. The design of the facade is highly Mannerist with the entablature broken from above by the lower part of the tall dormer windows and a Grecian motif connecting the capitals. The central bay, where the principal entrance was originally located, is surmounted by an open-bed pediment, and the curved pediments at the top of the pavilions are decorated with carved reliefs (heavily restored), which feature deer and hound heads, reflecting Diane de France's keen interest in the hunt.

The appearance of the garden facade, preserved in an engraving after Claude Chastillon and an engraving by Israël Silvestre, was then quite different from its current state: the entrance was served by a double Italian-style straight staircase facing a large parterre which stretched to the current rue de Sévigné; the facade also featured two pavilions on each side, and the same pilasters as the courtyard facade.

The garden façade in the 17th century

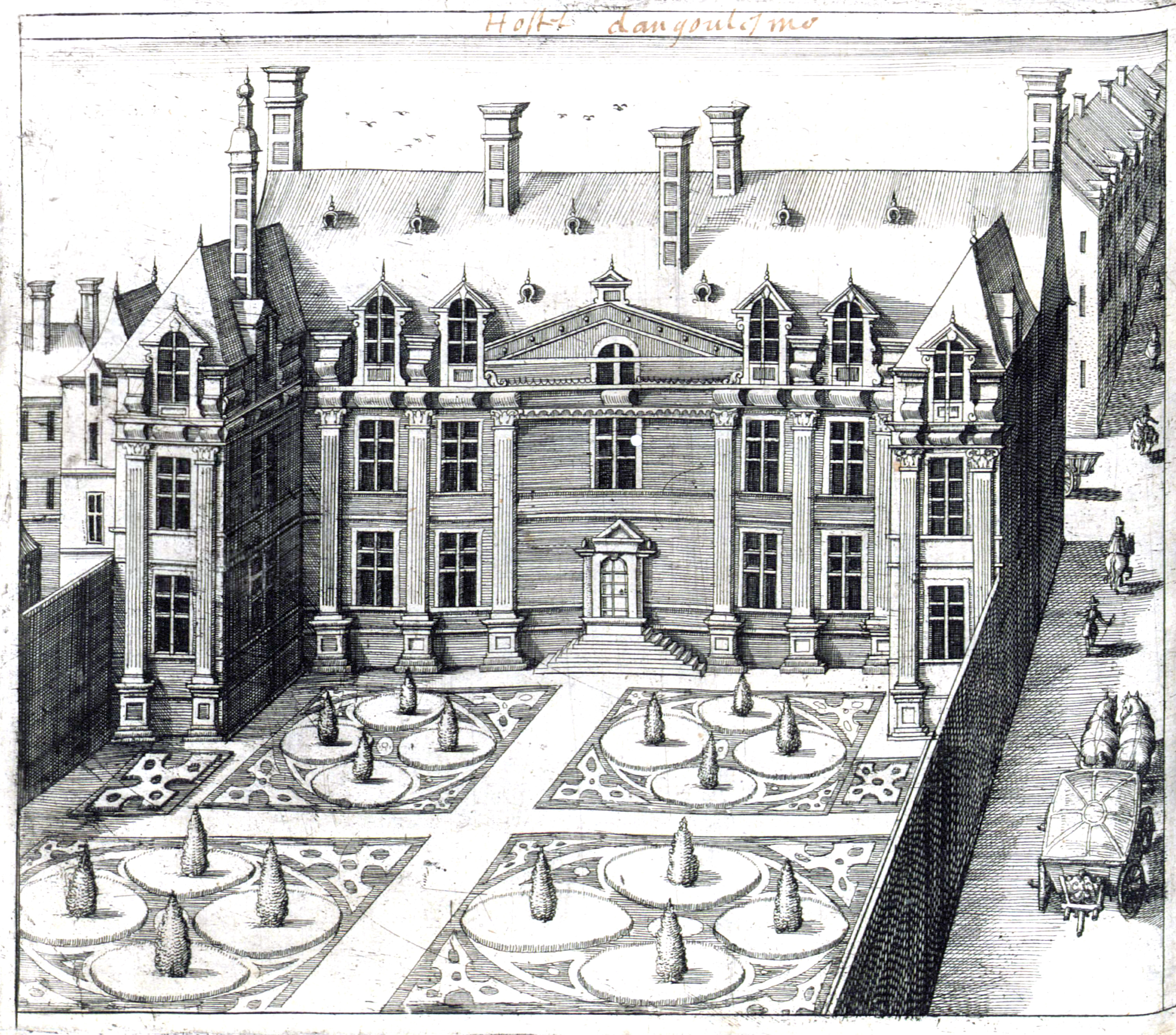
Engraving after Claude Chastillon, c. 1611

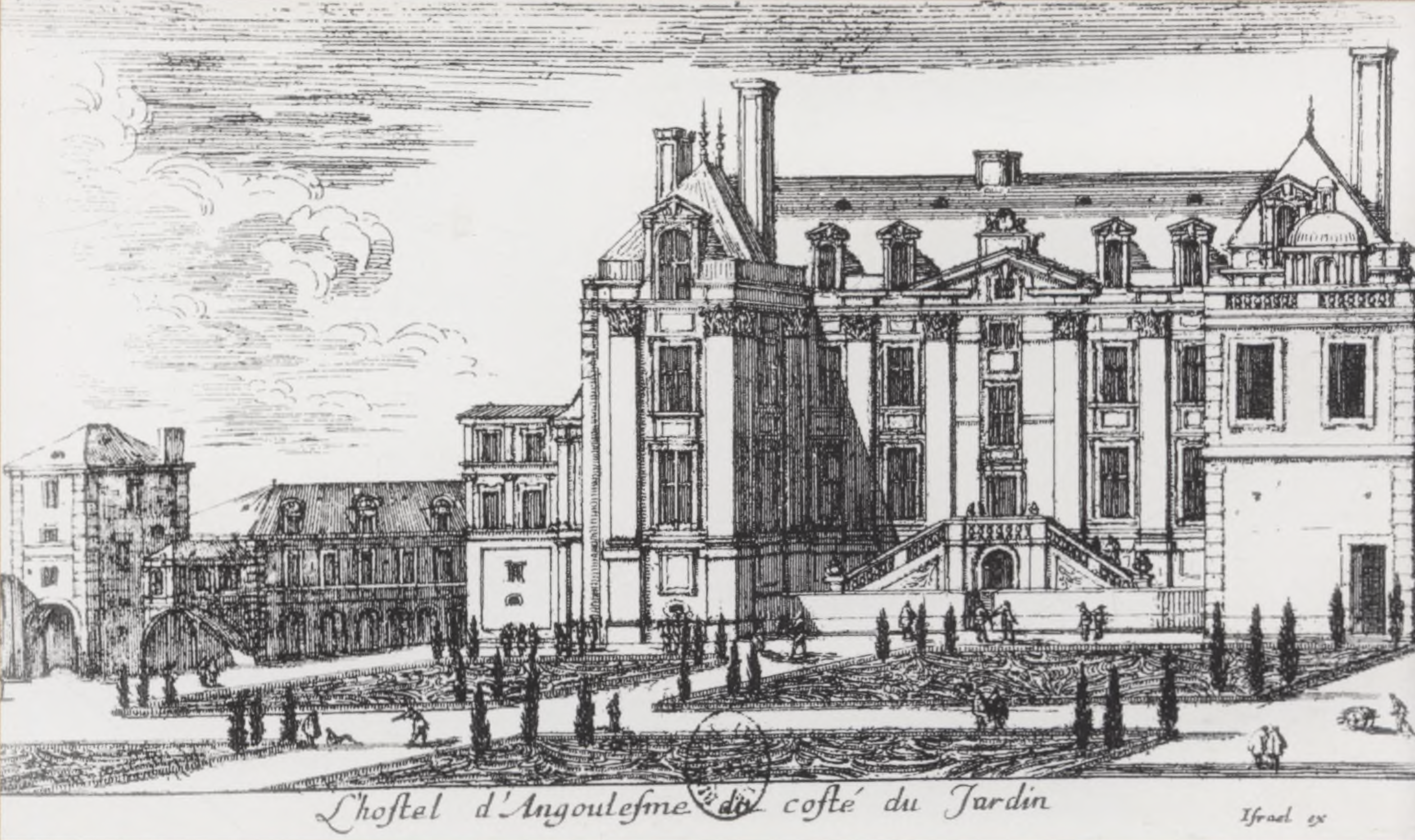
Engraving by Israël Silvestre, c. 1650

=== Modifications under Charles de Valois ===
Following the death of Diane in 1619, Charles de Valois, illegitimate son of Charles IX and nephew of Henri III, inherited the building and lived in it until 1650. He commissioned architects François Boullet and Jean Thiriot to enlarge the hôtel, altering the original plan, between 1624 and 1640. A new wing north of the entrance courtyard was added, facing the rue des Francs-Bourgeois; a small watchtower cabinet, corbelled into the street corner wall, allowed the fidgety Charles d'Angoulème to spy on both streets. A bellicose commander during the troubled era of the Wars of Religion, Charles kept in the building a large number of weapons, carabins, muskets, using it as a military structure.

The north wing, built in the early 17th-century

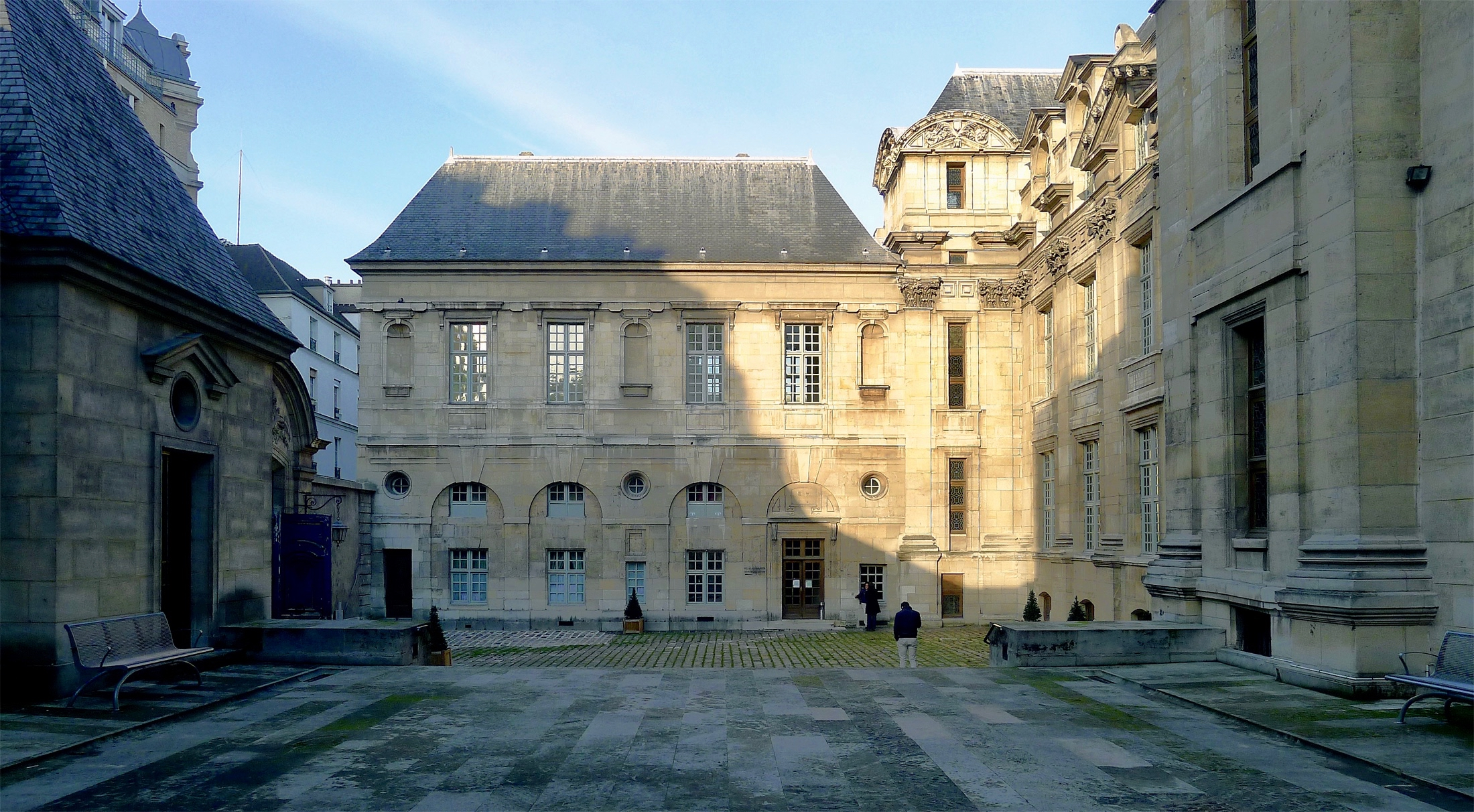
Courtyard façade of the north wing on the far side of the main courtyard
Corbelled cabinet on the northwest corner of the north wing

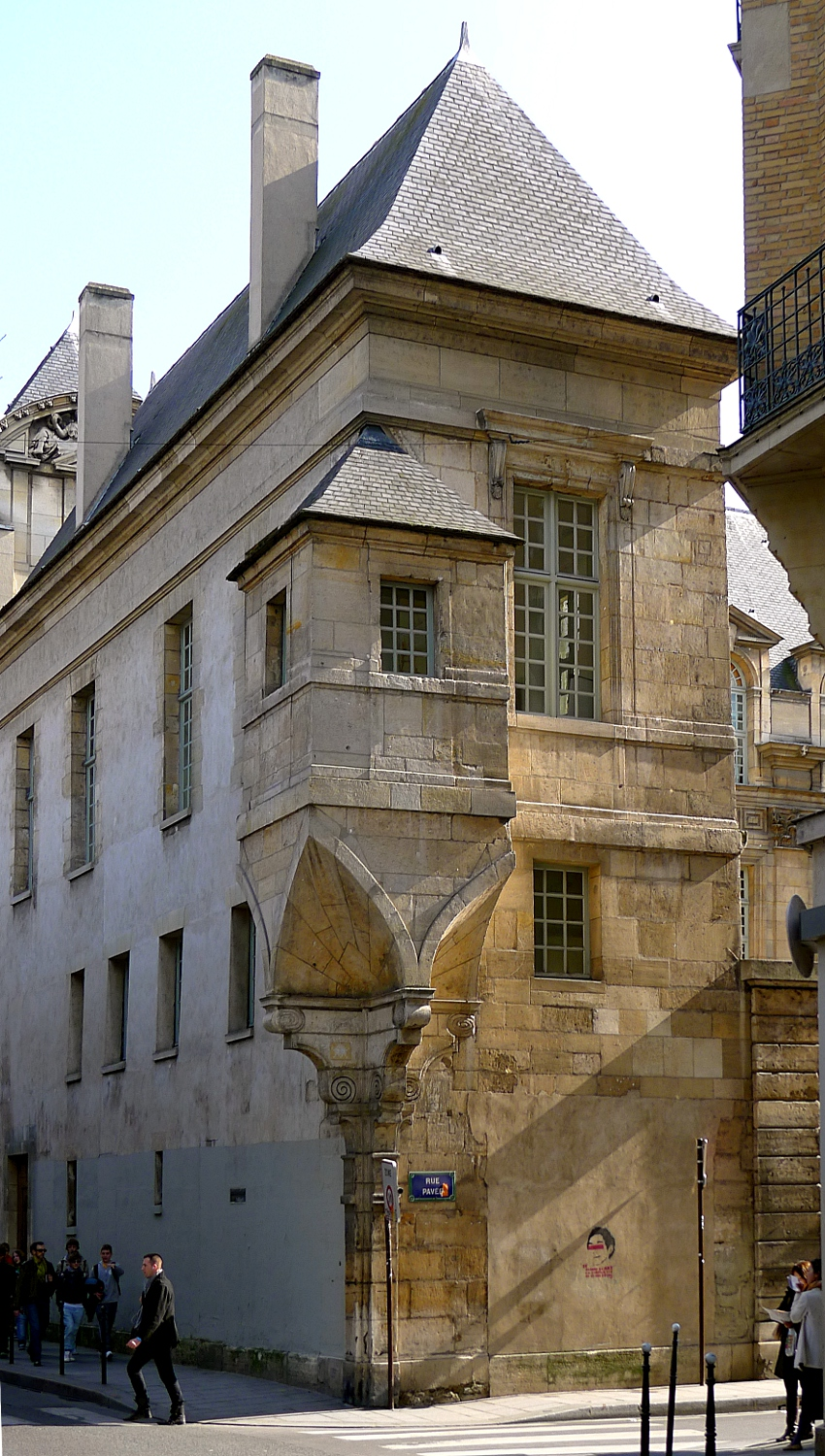
Rue Pavée on the right and rue des Francs-Bourgeois on the left

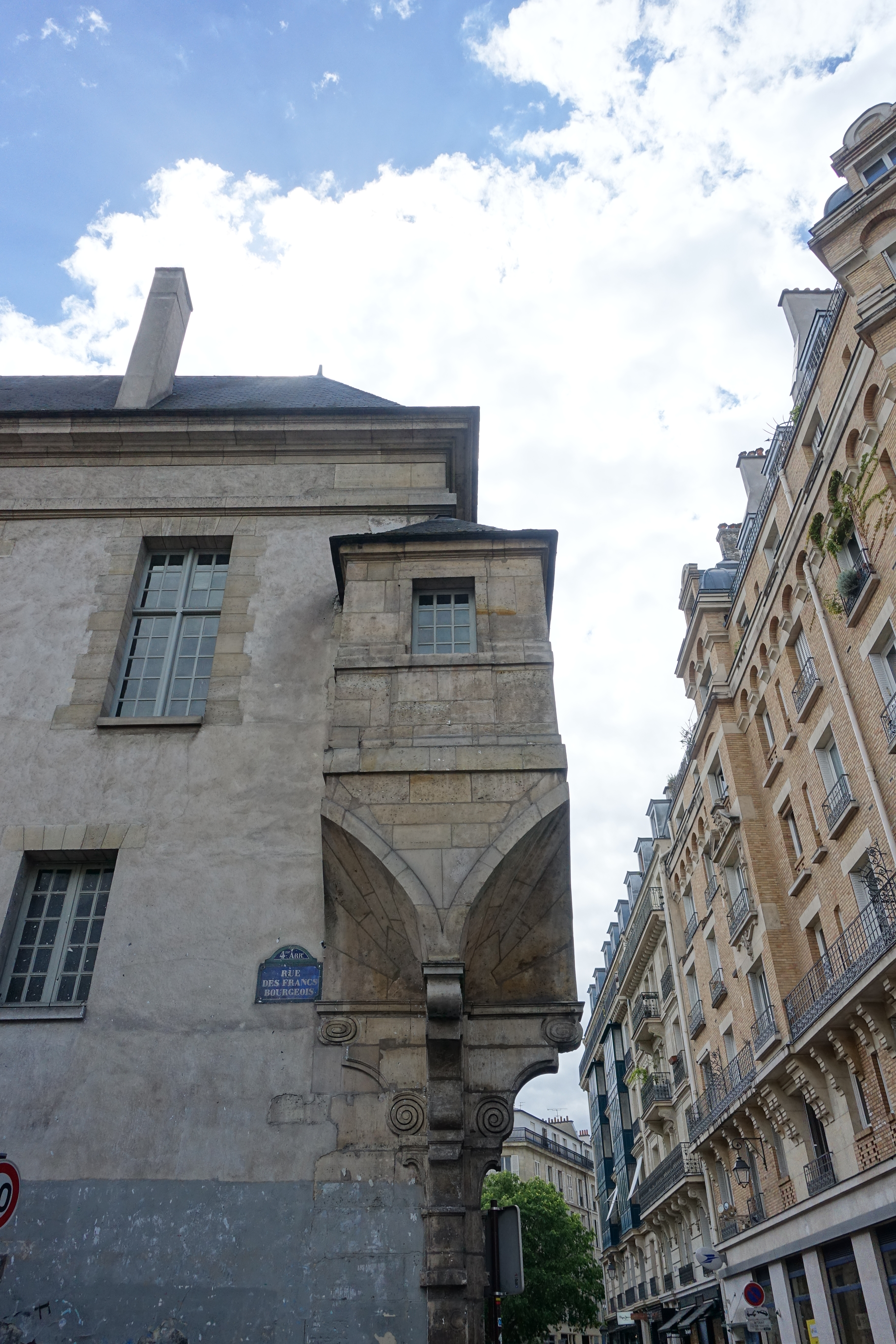
Looking south from the rue des Francs-Bourgeois

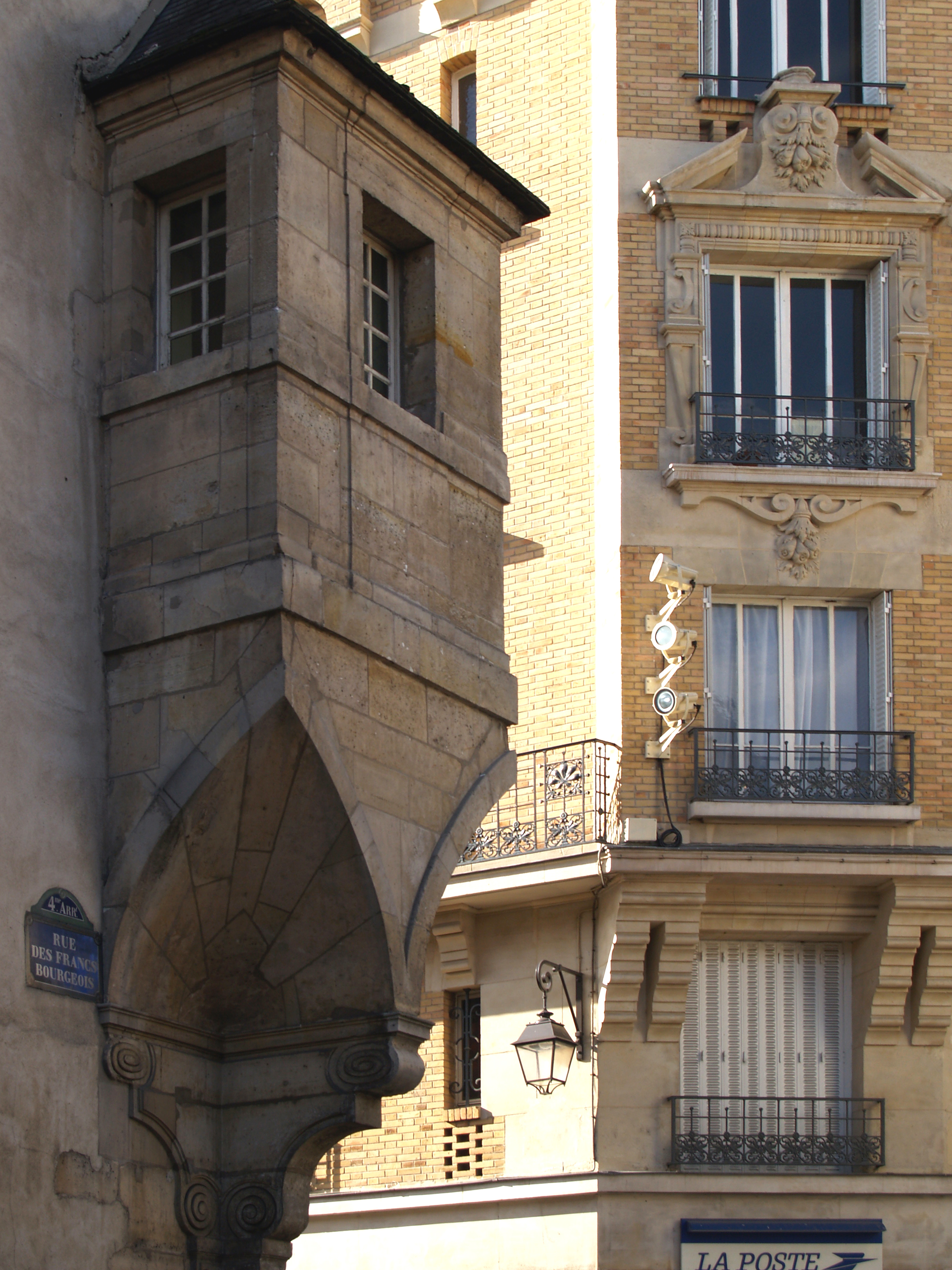
Looking southwest

=== Modifications under the Lamoignons ===
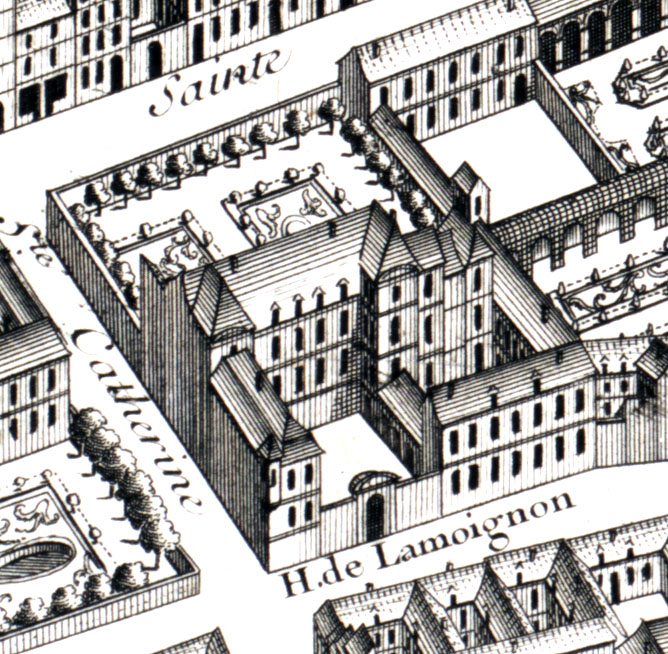
The Hôtel de Lamoignon as depicted on a 1739 map of Paris

After 1650, the building was divided into several residences. One of its tenants in the late 17th century was Guillaume de Lamoignon, President of the Parlement of Paris. He managed there to gather a small salon, frequented by Madame de Sévigné, Racine, Boileau, Bourdaloue, Regnard or Guy Patin. The hôtel remained among the Lamoignon family until 1750, this long-lasting occupation giving the building its current and usual name. As such, it was the birthplace of Malesherbes. After renting it for many years, Chrétien-François I^{er} de Lamoignon, son of Guillaume, finally acquired the whole hôtel in 1688.

==== Project of Robert de Cotte ====
Chrétien-François thereafter commissioned prominent royal architect Robert de Cotte to rearrange it. In 1708, De Cotte and his agency carried out several repairs and planned a bold reconstruction, which included the displacement of the rue Pavée in front of the building to enlarge the courtyard, the construction of a new curved portal and a new wing in the centre of the courtyard to serve as a new main building with a monumental staircase and the modification of the garden facade. Two architectural drawings of the project have been retrieved from the papers of the agency and are still preserved at the Bibliothèque nationale de France. The project would have completely changed the orientation of the hôtel, from north/south to east/west. This was not followed by any further major modifications, probably due to the death of Chrétien-François de Lamoignon in 1709. The current building is still close to its 17th-century arrangement, the courtyard being largely untouched. However, possibly in preparation for the fulfilment of the project, the garden facade was modified, its pediment, the giant pilasters, and all its ornaments removed, the front steps moved (probably to fit the projected symmetry of the new building), and the south pavilion removed. This modification resulted in the austere, asymmetrical facade currently visible from the rue des Francs-Bourgeois and the public garden adjoined.

Drawings for the unrealized project by Robert de Cotte (1708)

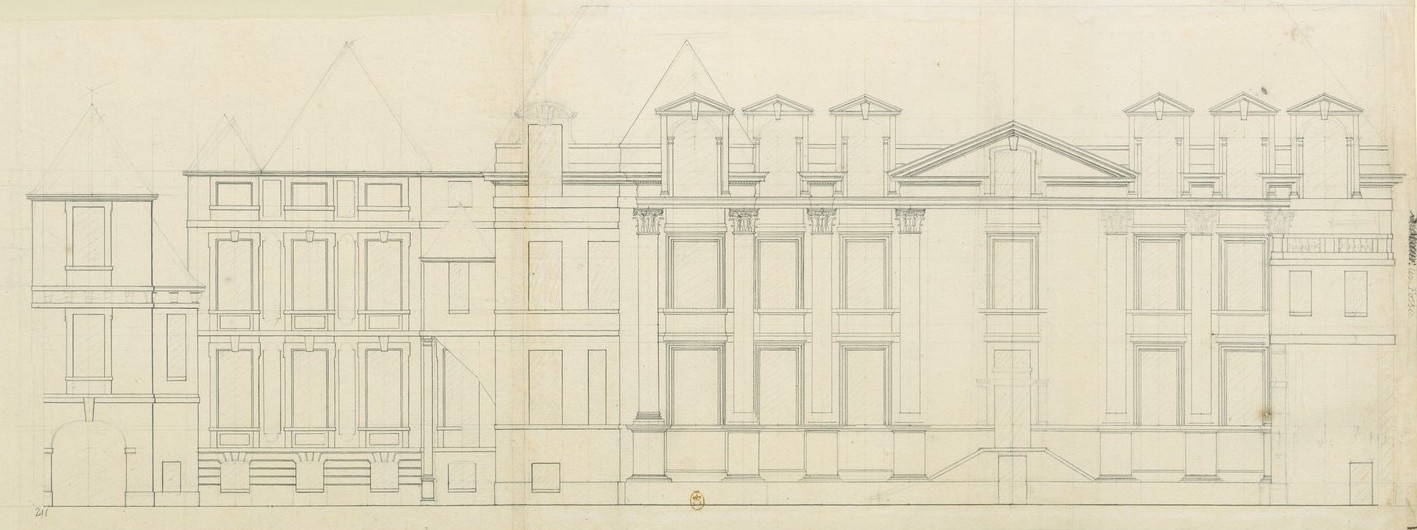
Garden façade

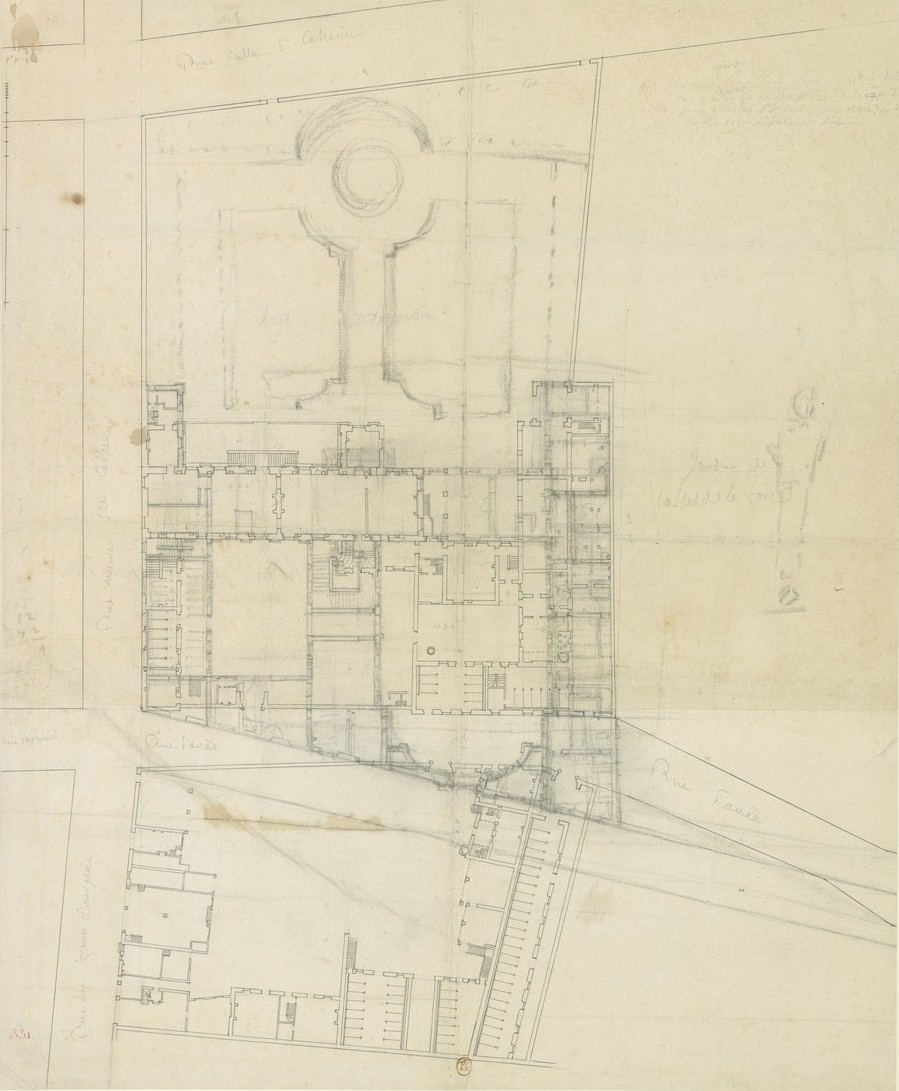
Plan
Austere, asymmetrical garden façade

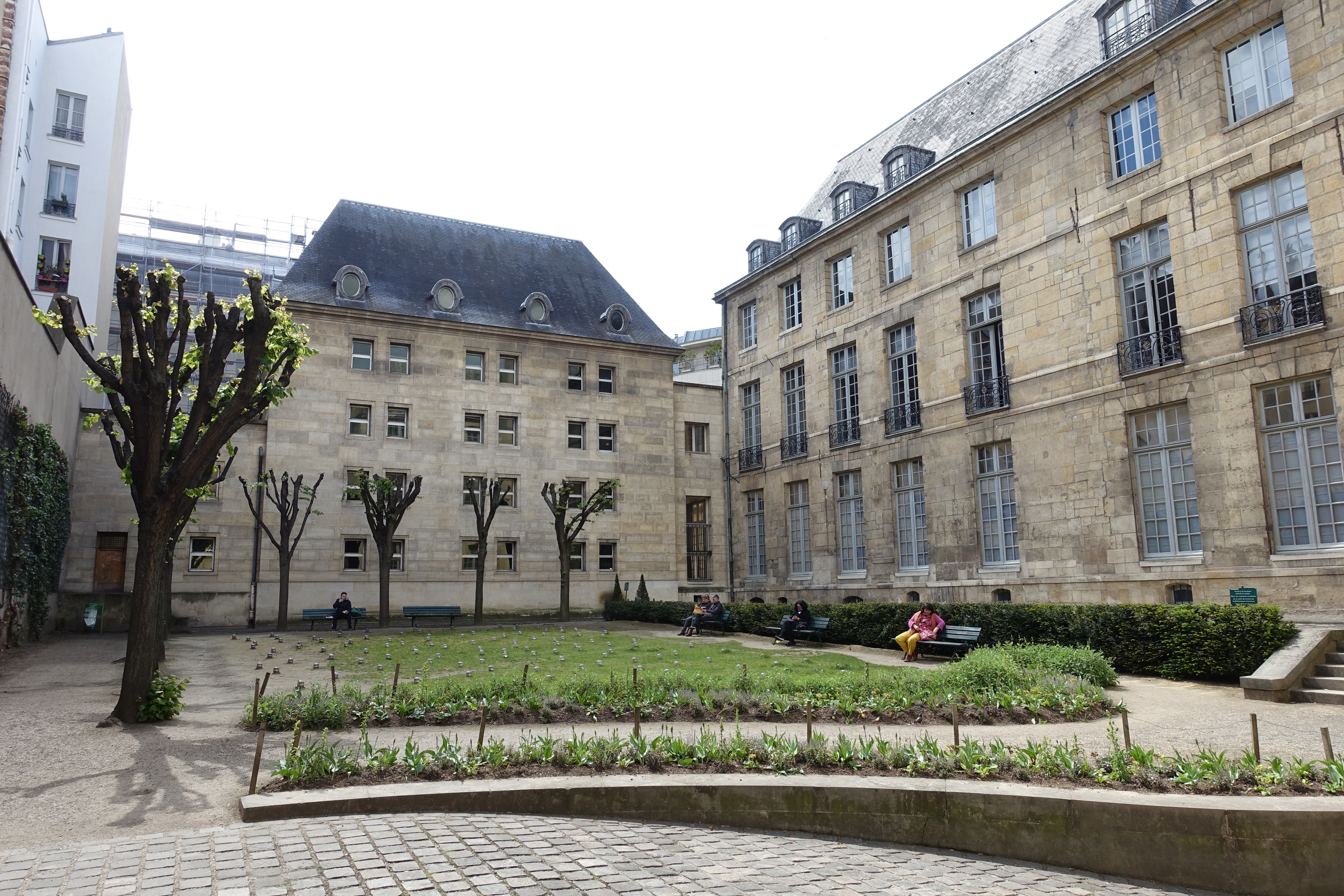
View to the southwest. The south wing was constructed in the 1960s.

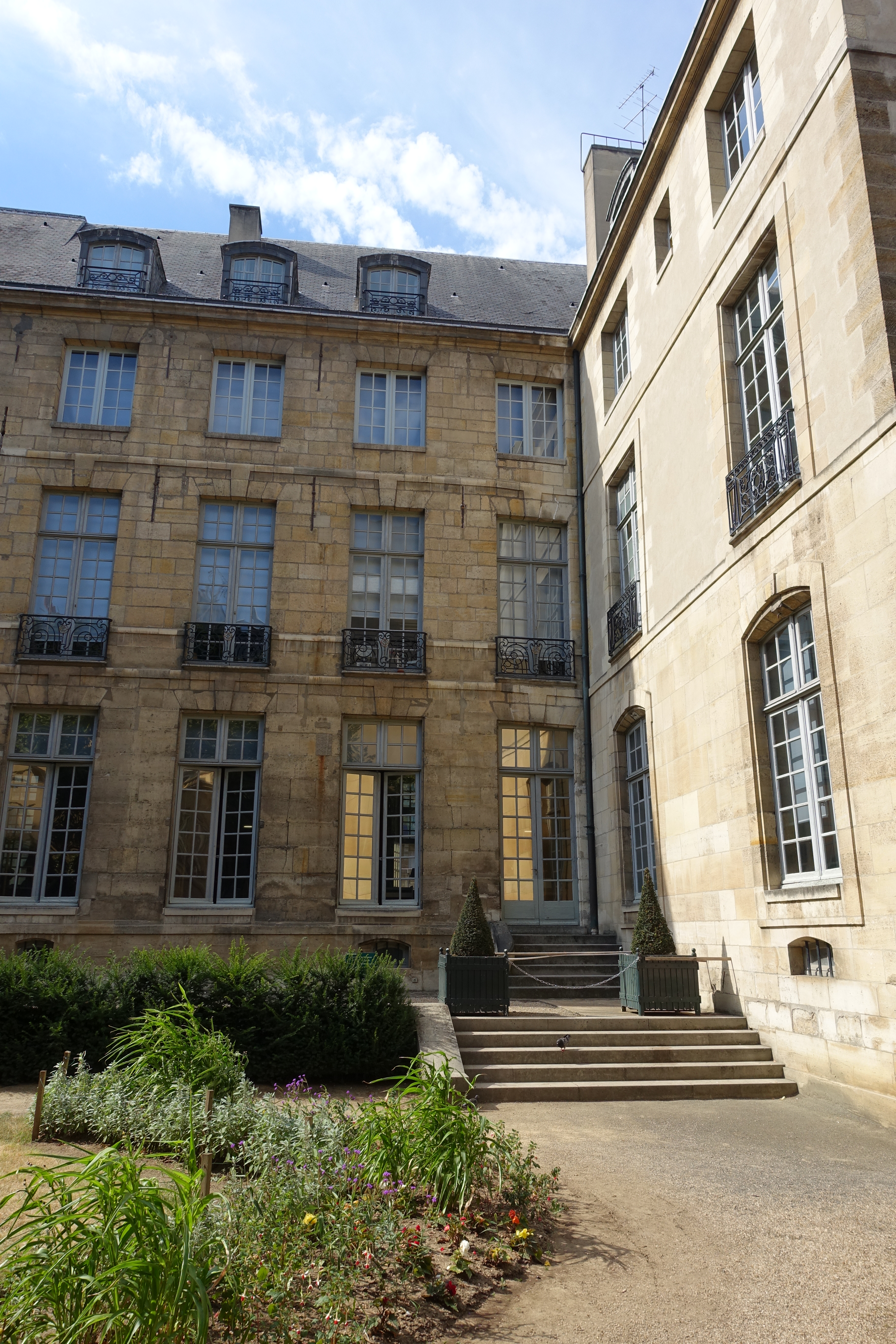
View to the northwest

==== Main portal ====
In 1718, the widow of Chrétien-François, Marie-Jeanne de Lamoignon, had the current portal to the courtyard constructed. It features two carved putti, the one on the left holding a mirror symbolizing Truth, and the one on the right holding a snake symbolizing Prudence.

Courtyard gateway constructed in 1718

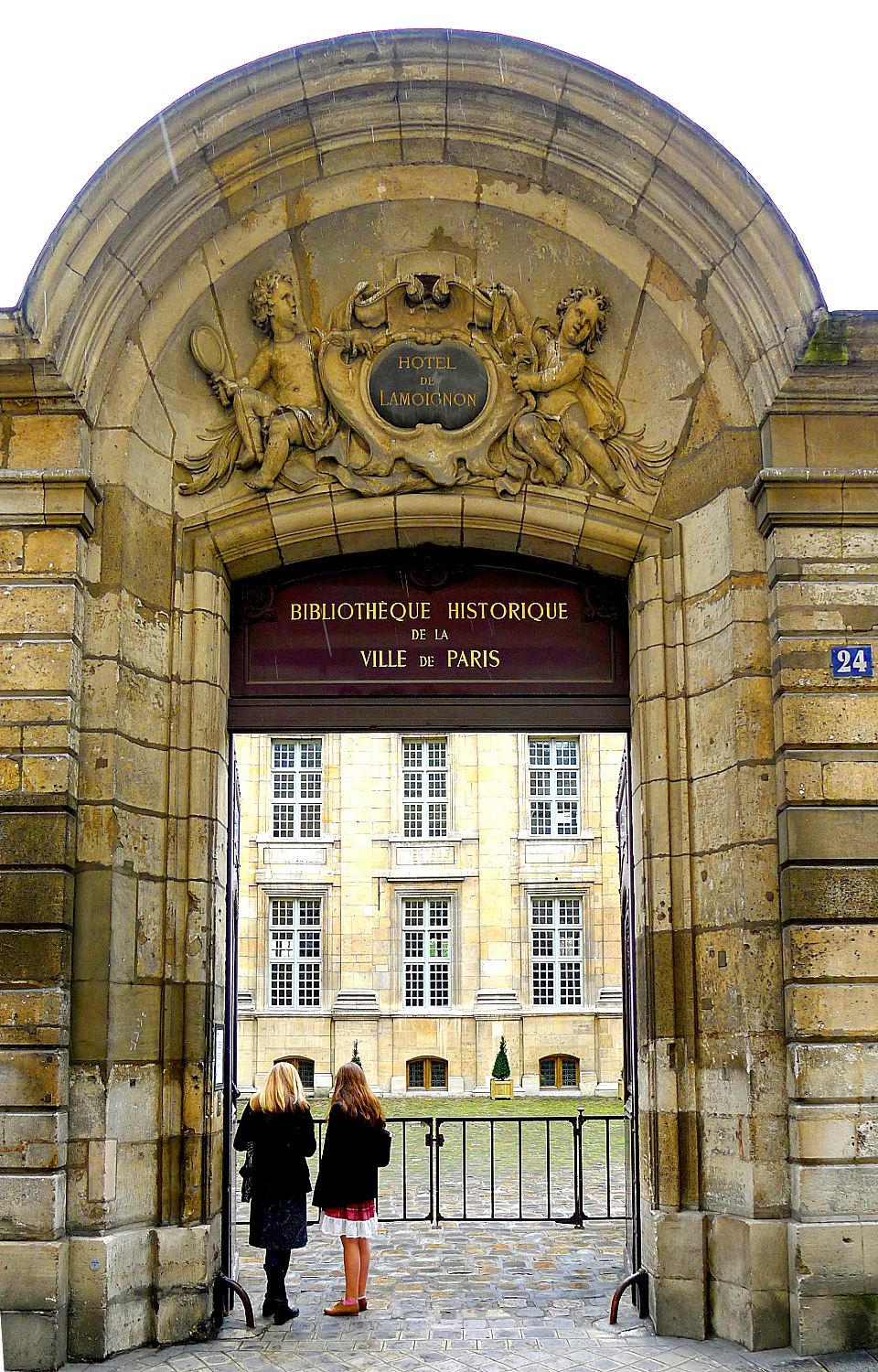
Full view

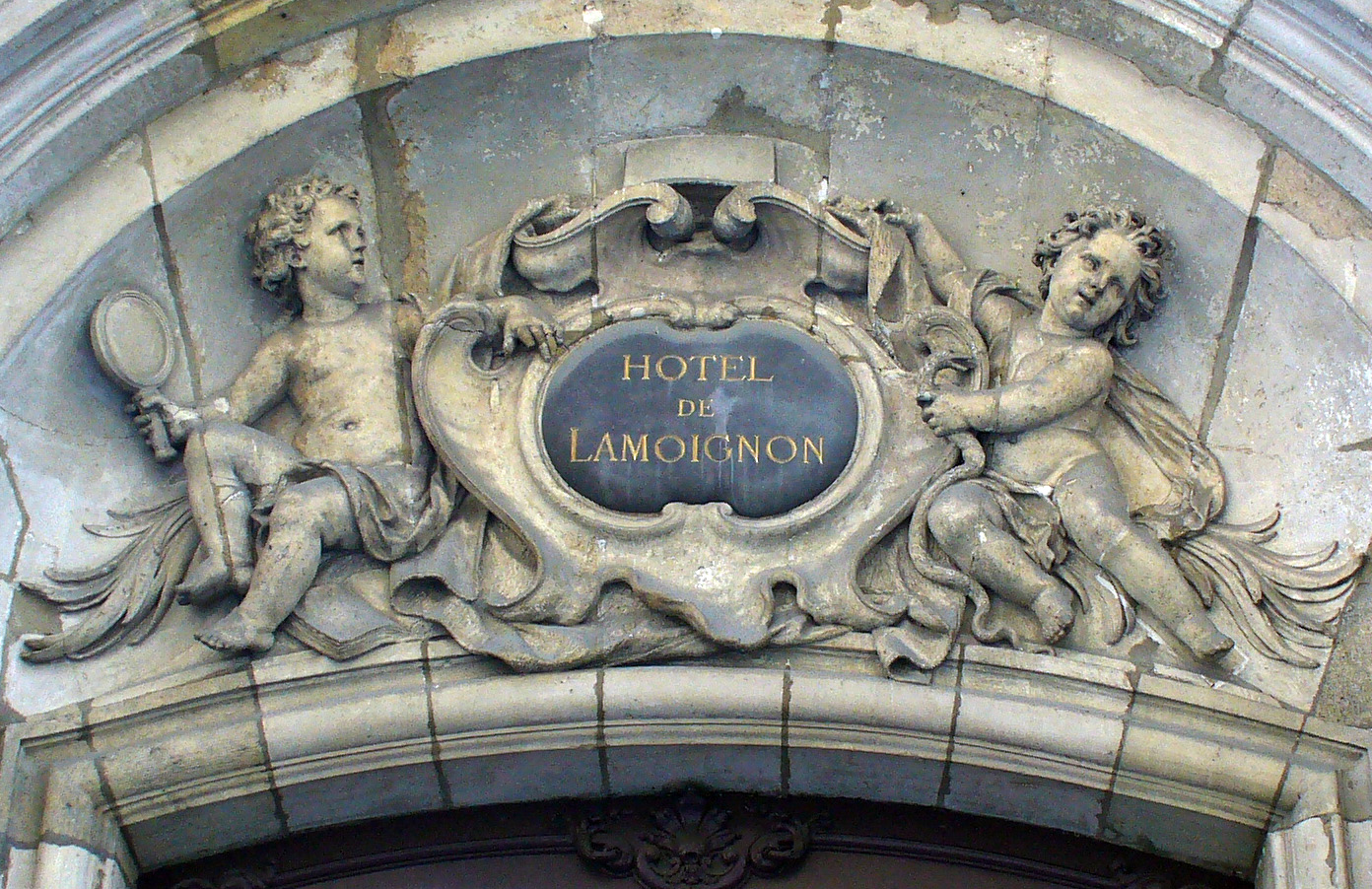
Detail of the tympanum with the name of the hôtel

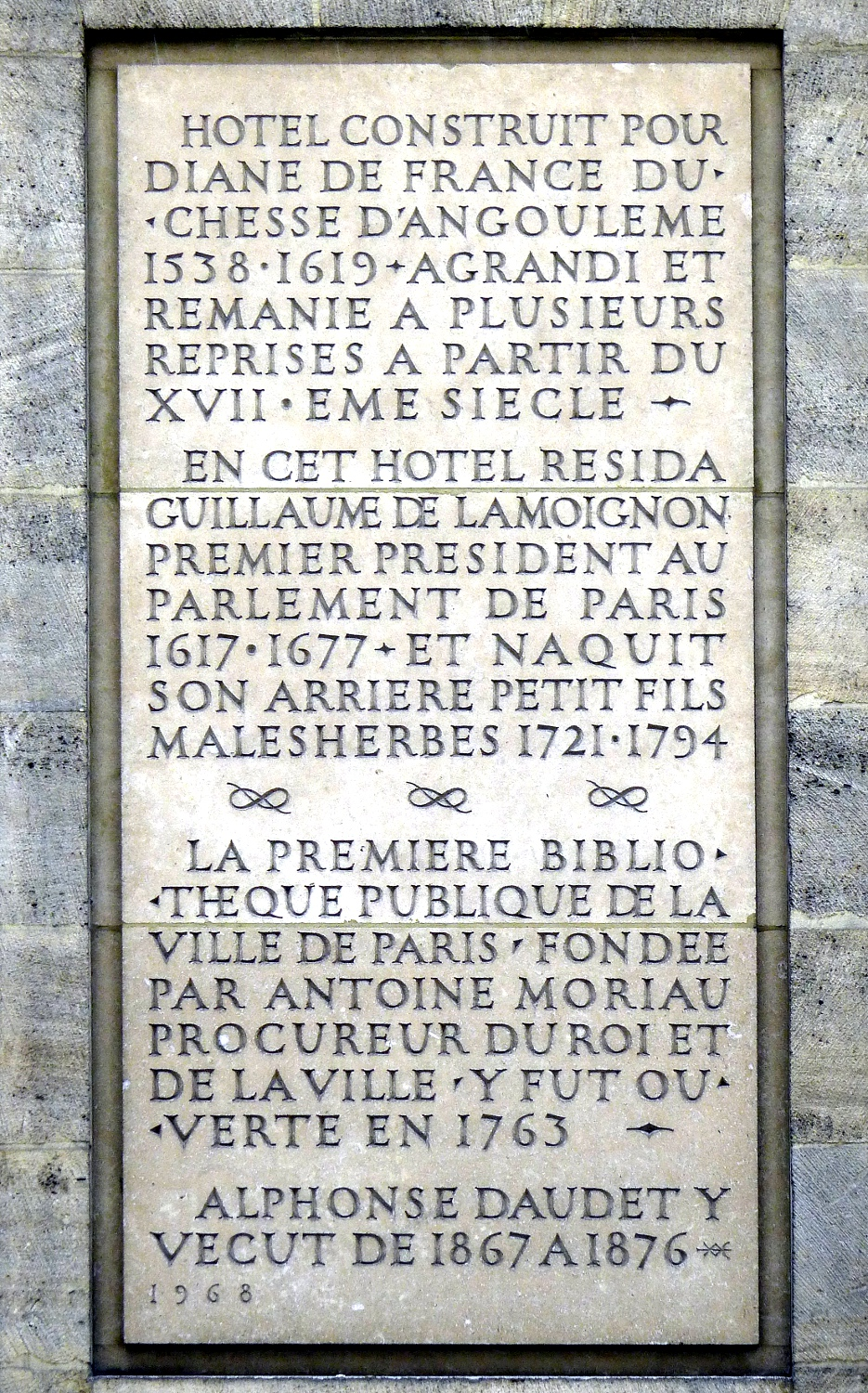
Commemorative plaque on the street facade, mentioning the building by Diane de France, the Lamoignon family including Malesherbes, the status of first public library of Paris, Alphonse Daudet.

=== First public municipal library of Paris ===
In 1750, Guillaume de Lamoignon de Blancmesnil left the hôtel for the Grand Chancery after being designated Chancellor of France. It was then rented by Antoine Moriau, prosecutor for the King and the city of Paris. Moriau, a bibliophile and scholar, used it to keep his large private library, which included a vast collection of preserved documents on the history of Paris. At his death in 1759, he bequeathed 14,000 volumes to the city, which, in 1763, opened the collection to the public. It is historically the first public municipal library of Paris. In 1774, the Lamoignon family sold the hôtel, which thereafter belonged to architect Jean-Baptiste Louis Élisabeth Le Boursier.

=== Period of decline after the French Revolution ===
After the French Revolution, like many of the Marais' hôtels particuliers, the building entered a progressive decrepitude. Divided into several tenuous residences, the building housed throughout the 19th century workshops, stores, and factories, among which was the headquarters of an alembic and distillation instruments company. The east part of the garden, including a pond, was built up. Among the many tenants was Alphonse Daudet, who lived in the hôtel with his family from 1867 onwards, and who invited over such friends as Turgenev, Flaubert, or Edmond de Goncourt.

=== Becomes a recognised historic landmark ===
In 1872 and 1873, the idea emerged in the municipal council to buy and restore the building, to extend the nearby Carnavalet Museum. This was not realised until March 1928: the City of Paris acquired the hôtel in exchange, as compensation for the previous owner, of a larger vacant lot near the Porte de Champerret.

Despite the initial project, the City decided to move its municipal historical library into the building, the Bibliothèque Historique de la Ville de Paris, previously housed in the Hôtel Le Peletier de Saint-Fargeau, allowing the latter to be annexed to the Carnavalet Museum. Between 1955 and 1968, the building was restored and extended to finally house the library. The heritage site architects, Jean-Pierre Paquet, Jean Creuzot, and André Vois first strengthened the hôtel, which was in danger of collapsing, destroyed all the 19th-century additions in the courtyard and gardens, and restored the hôtel to its early-modern appearance, including the interior and its painted panellings. From 1964 onwards, a new wing was added to the south, which serves as a conservation area for the growing archival collections. The new construction was deliberately kept simple and austere to highlight the original and restored Renaissance hôtel. Two more basement floors were also dug under the foundations.

20th century restoration and extensions (1955-1968)

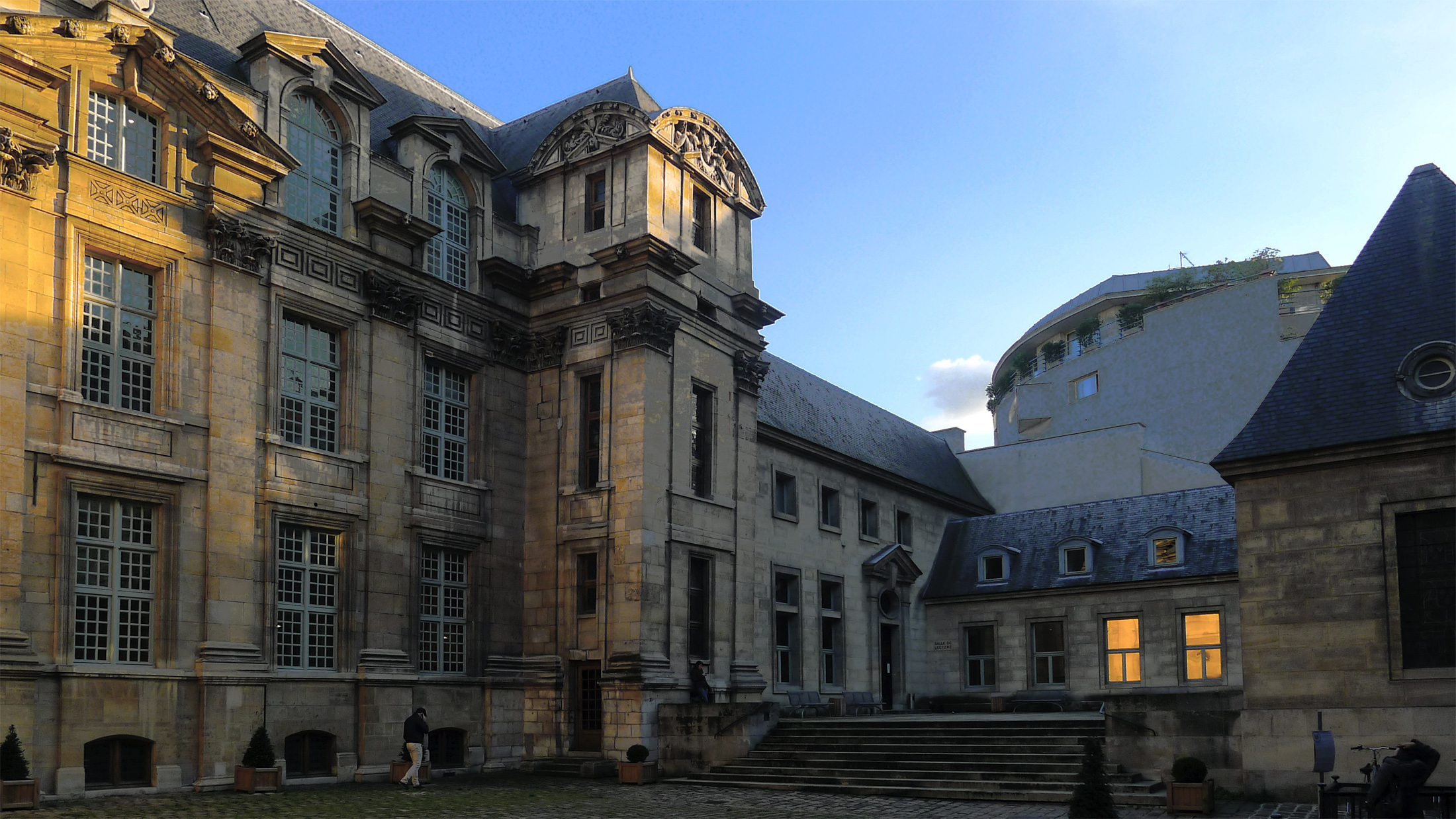
The new U-shaped wing on the right, with the 16th-century original facade on the left

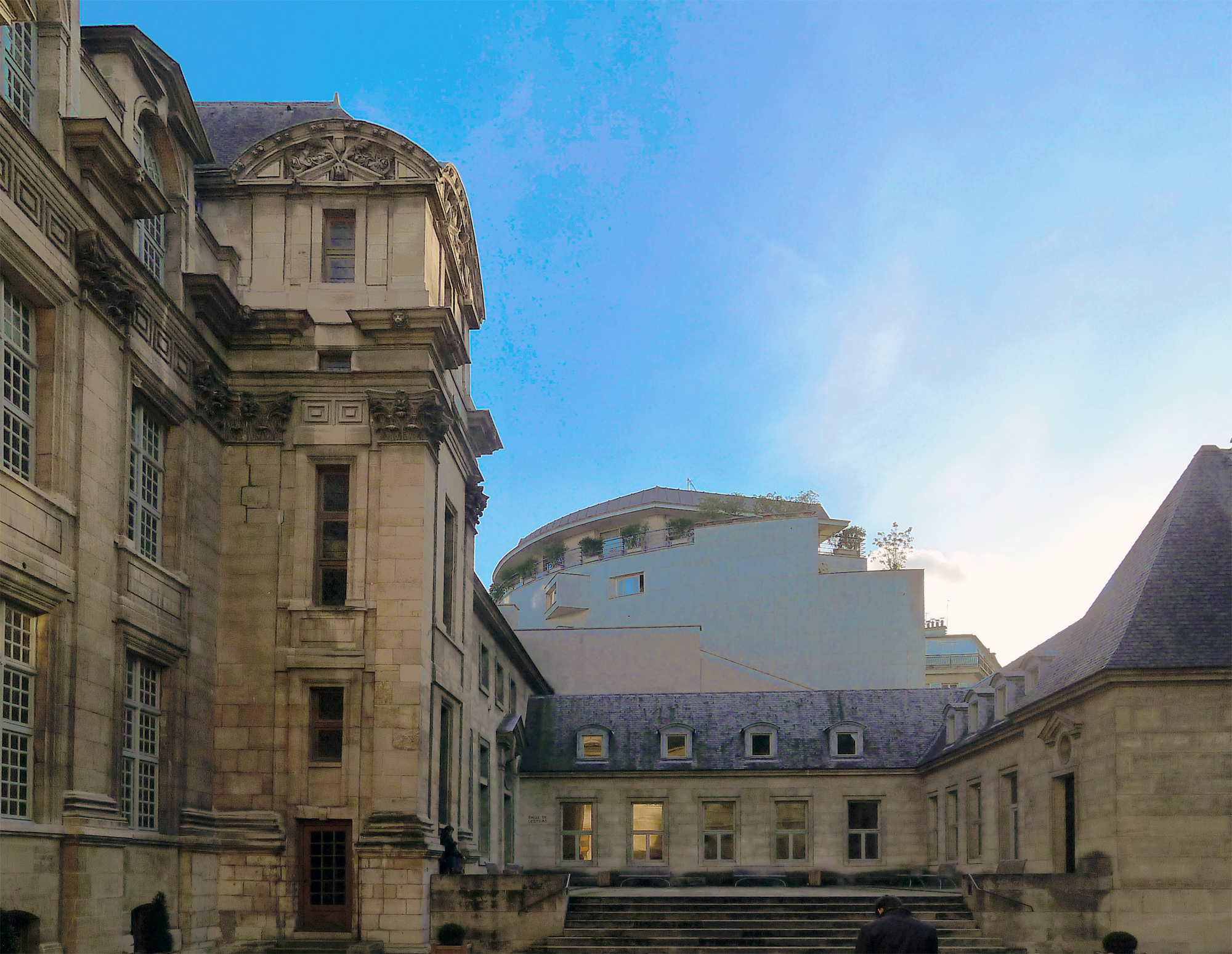
Extensions from the main courtyard

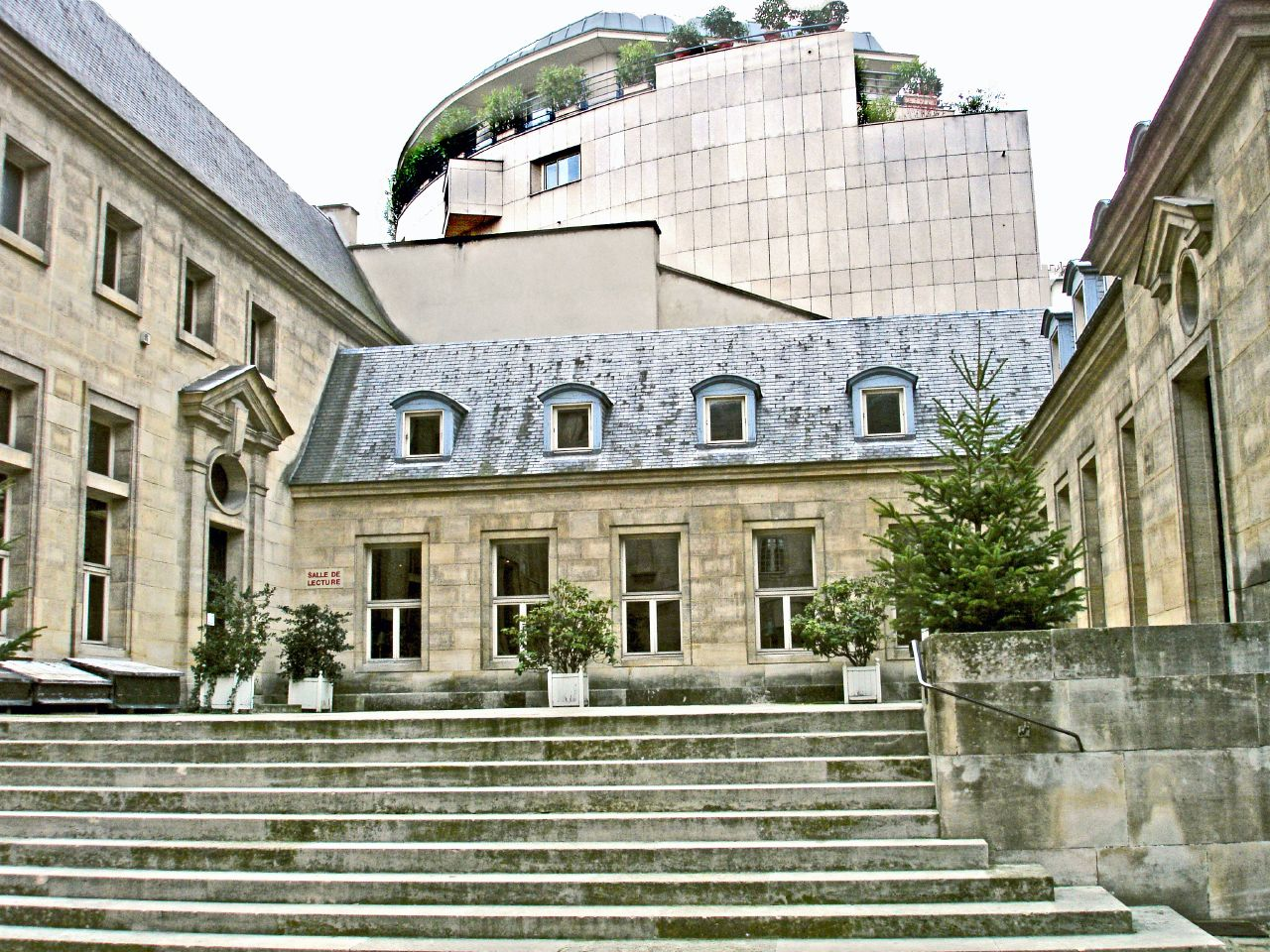
Closer view of the extension

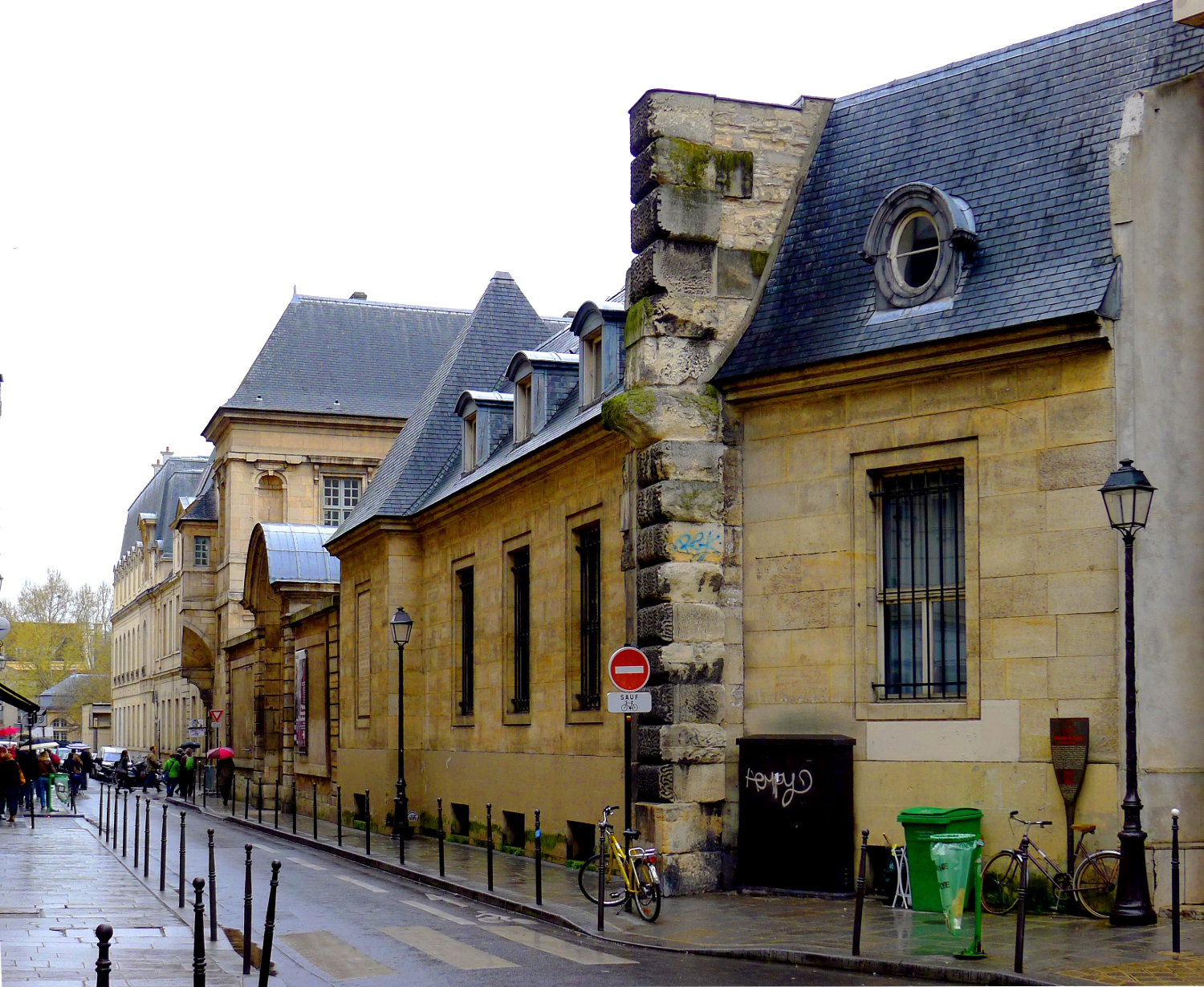
The new wing also has a street facade (the main portal being on the left of the picture), in which a wall of La Force Prison, formerly on this location, was kept

== Bibliography ==
- Ayers, Andrew (2004). The Architecture of Paris. Stuttgart; London: Edition Axel Menges. ISBN 9783930698967.
- Ballon, Hilary (1991). The Paris of Henri IV: Architecture and Urbanism. Cambridge, Massachusetts: The MIT Press. ISBN 978-0-262-02309-2.
- Blunt, Anthony (1999). Art and Architecture in France, 1500–1700, fifth edition revised by Richard Beresford. New Haven: Yale University Press. ISBN 9780300077353. ISBN 9780300077483 (paperback).
- Dauvergne, Robert (1961) “Une grande résidence au Marais en 1650 : l'hôtel du duc d'Angoulême”, Bulletin de la Société de l'histoire de Paris et de l'Île-de-France, 1961, p. 81-90
- Fossier, François (1997). "122. Paris. Hôtel de Lamoignon", pp. 318–319, in Les dessins du fonds Robert de Cotte de la Bibliothèque nationale de France : Architecture et décor. Paris: Bibliothèque nationale de France, ISBN 271771975X. Rome: École française de Rome, ISBN 2728303681.
- Gady, Alexandre (2008). Les hôtels particuliers de Paris, du Moyen-Âge à la Belle époque, Paris, Parigramme. 2012 edition: ISBN 9782840967040.
- Gady, Alexandre (1992), “L'hôtel Lamoignon, 25 rue des Francs-Bourgeois et 22-24 rue Pavée”, dans La Rue des Francs-Bourgeois sous la dir. de Béatrice de Andia et A. Gady, Paris, 1992, p. 69-87
- Guillaume, Jean (2014). "Philibert Delorme à l'hôtel d'Angoulème ? Réflexions sur une attribution", pp. 47–52, Société française d'archéologie, Bulletin monumental, 2014, no. 172-1.
- Hartmann, Georges (1917). "Hôtel Lamoignan", pp. 159–166 (at HathiTrust), in Procès-verbaux de la Commission municipale du Vieux Paris, Année 1917. Paris: Imprimerie Municipale, 1922.
- Leproux, Guy-Michel (2008). “Philibert Delorme architecte à Paris sous le règne de François I^{er} : les hôtels de Pisseleu et de Saint-Han dits d'Angoulême et de Marle”, Documents d'histoire parisienne, 14, p. 17-22.
- Pébay, Isabelle and Troquet, Claude (1991) “Diane de France et la construction des hôtels d'Angoulême”, in Bulletin de la Société d'histoire de Paris et de l'Île-de-France, 1991, p. 35-69
- Surirey de Saint-Remy, Henry de (1969). « "La bibliothèque historique de la Ville de Paris". Bulletin des bibliothèques de France (BBF), 1969, no. 2, pp. 47-62.
- Thomson, David (1984). Renaissance Paris: Architecture and Growth, 1475-1600, Berkeley, University of California Press. ISBN 9780520053595.
