= Bibliothèque historique de la ville de Paris =

Coordinates: 48.8569°N 2.3619°E

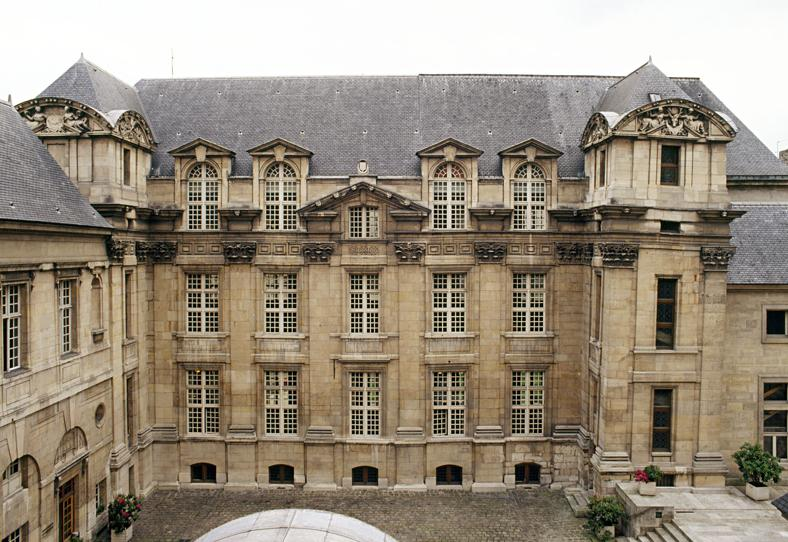
Front of the building - from the courtyard

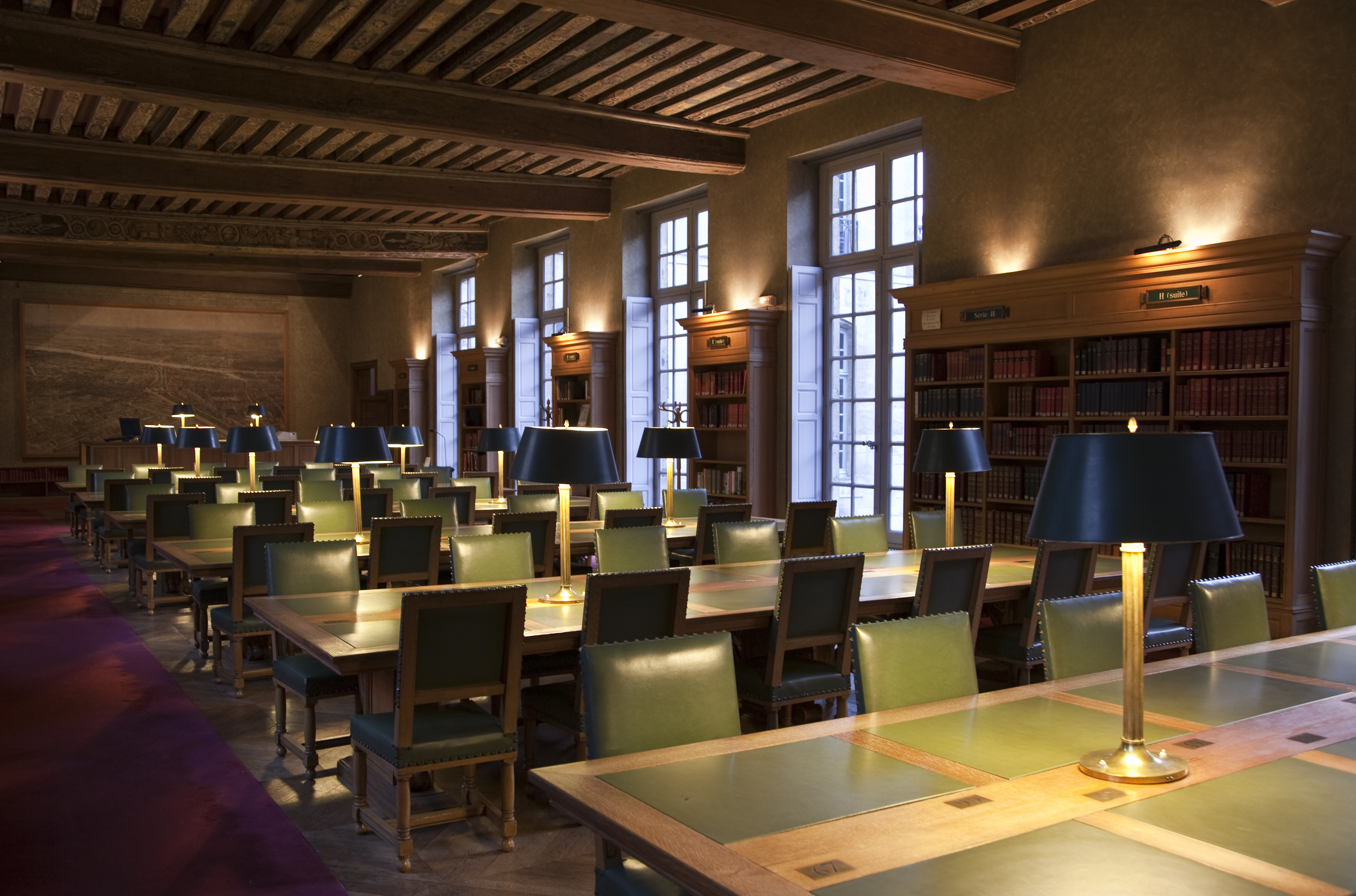
The reading room

The Bibliothèque Historique de la Ville de Paris, commonly abbreviated with the acronym BHVP, is a public library specializing in the history of the city of Paris, France. Formerly in the Hôtel Saint-Fargeau (now part of the Musée Carnavalet), when it was also known as the Bibliothèque Saint-Fargeau, since 1969 the BHVP has been located in the Hôtel d'Angoulême Lamoignon at 24 rue Pavée, in the Marais (4th arrondissement) in Paris.

The old city library was located in the Paris Hôtel de Ville (city hall), which fire destroyed in May 1871. In 1872, pursuant to a bequest by Jules Cousin (1830 - 1899), the city moved to create a library devoted entirely to the history of the capital: the Bibliothèque Historique de la Ville de Paris.

The BHVP collection brings together documents dating from the 16th century through the present on the history of Paris and the Île-de-France region. The BHVP is open to the public, allowing access to approximately one million books and booklets, 21,000 manuscripts, as well as plans, maps, and photographs that cover a variety of aspects of Paris including topographic, historic, social, artistic, literary, etc.

The BHVP is one of the specialized libraries integrated into the network of Paris municipal libraries, and houses the city's historical research service.

The public access to its garden named Hôtel-Lamoignon - Mark Ashton garden is located at 25, rue des Francs-Bourgeois.

== See also ==
- List of libraries in France
