= Claude Chastillon =

French architect, military and civil engineer, and topographical draughtsman

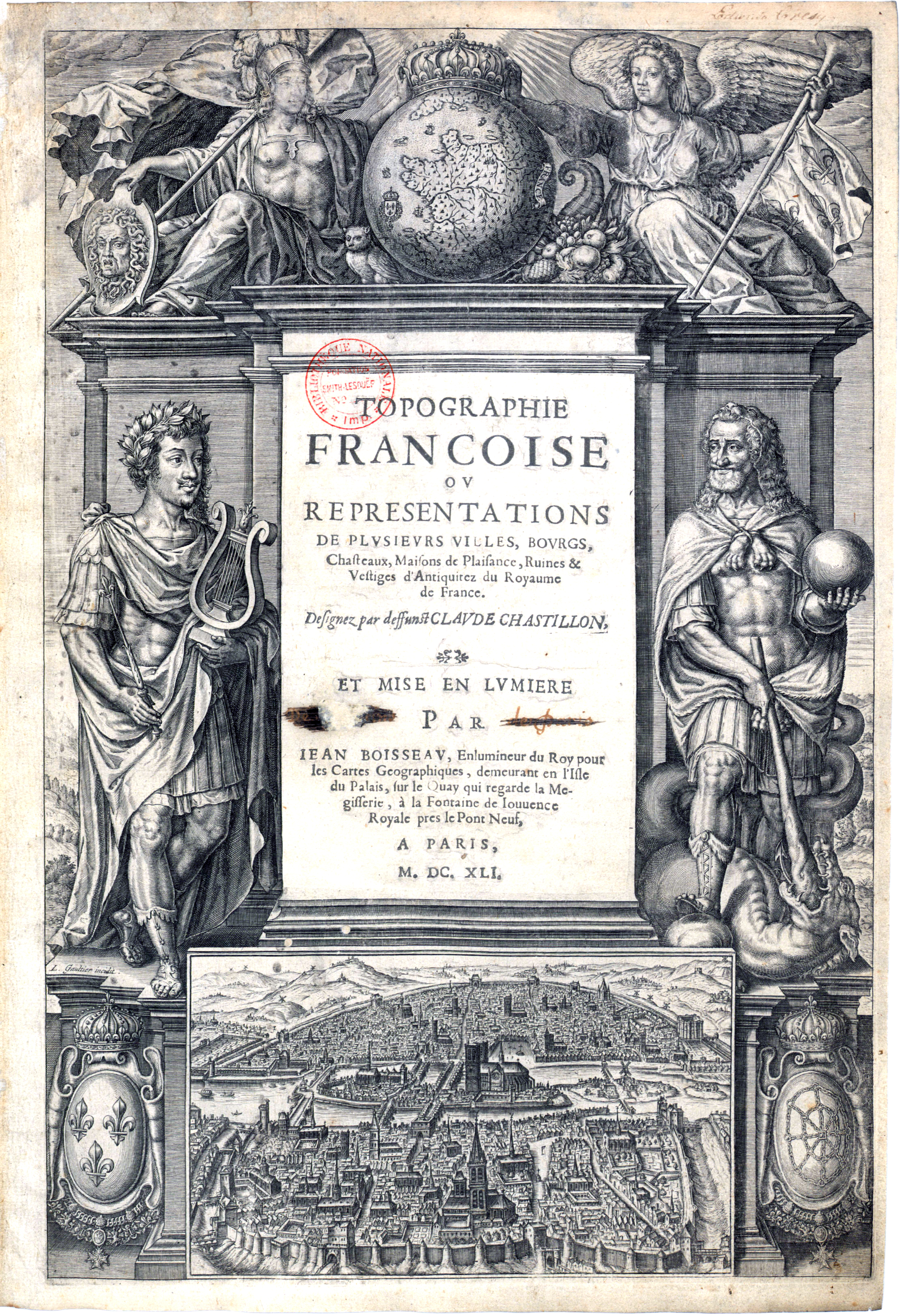
Title page of Topographie françoise by Claude Chastillon

Claude Chastillon or Chatillon (1559 or 1560 – 27 April 1616) was a French architect, military and civil engineer, and topographical draughtsman, who served under Henry IV of France. His most notable work, Topographie françoise, published posthumously in 1641, is a collection of 500 views of French towns and buildings and constitutes a unique, if partial, historical account of French topography and architecture at the beginning of the 17th century.

== Life and career ==
Chastillon was born in Châlons-en-Champagne.

In the 1580s Chastillon became a part of the military retinue of Henry of Navarre (as Henry IV was known before he became king of France in 1589). In 1591 Henry made Chastillon the Royal Topographer (Topographe du Roi), a post that at the time was otherwise unknown, and in 1595, a Royal Engineer (Ingénieur du Roi), a post established in the early 16th century which identified a member of a corps responsible for military fortifications, the mechanics of besiegement, and hydraulics.

In the course of his professional duties, Chastillon toured France and neighboring countries and made drawings of many of the places he visited, including views of towns and buildings, ancient and contemporary. Many of these he began to have engraved. Among the engravers were Mathieu Merian, Léonard Gaultier, Joachim Duviert, and Jacques Poinssart. In 1616 Chastillon died in Paris without having published the bulk of his collection of drawings.

== Topographie françoise ==
Fifteen years after Chastillon's death, the publisher Jean Boisseau purchased the existing plates and drawings. He had Isaac Briot and Nicolas Briot, among others, engrave the drawings which had not yet been engraved and published the collection in 1641 as Topographie francoise ou representations de plusieurs villes, bourgs, chasteaux, maisons de plaisance, ruines & vestiges d’antiquité du royaume de France, crediting Chastillon as the creator of the drawings. Usually referred to simply as Topographie françoise, it provides a unique account of France at the beginning of the 17th century. It includes views of the houses and châteaux of officials and friends of the king, many now destroyed, and is therefore an invaluable source for the study of French noble residences of the period.

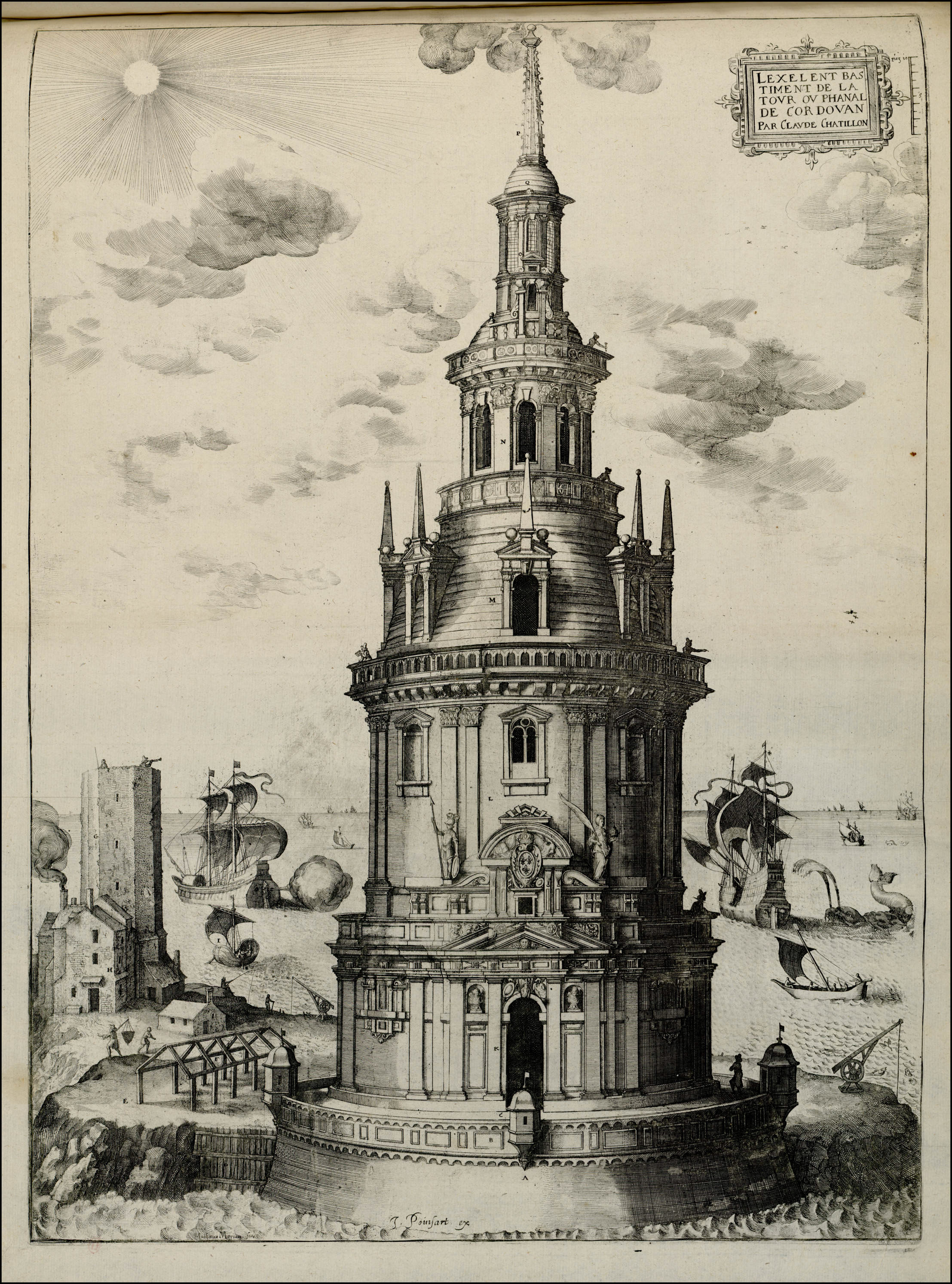
Chastillon's depiction of the Cordouan lighthouse

Errors were introduced in the second edition of 1648, when work of other artists was added. The second edition adds thirteen new plates, including several city plans, e.g., of Lunel, Montauban, and Montpellier, among others. Some of the plates had already appeared in copies published with a date on the title page of 1641, even though the plates themselves bear dates of 1642, 1643 and 1644. One of them is a unique view of the Cordouan lighthouse engraved by Jacques Poinssart. Chastillon had produced an expert evaluation for the completion of the lighthouse for Henry IV's minister, the Duke of Sully in 1606.

Louis Boissevin (c. 1610–1685), a book publisher and print merchant, purchased Topographie françoise from Boisseau and published a third edition in 1655. The plates were reordered alphabetically by name, but some of the views lacking titles were misidentified.

The errors of the 1648 and 1655 editions and the tendency of the drawings to exaggerate the sizes of buildings, as well as the coarse quality of many of the engravings, have led some historians to discount the accuracy and utility of Topographie françoise. Unfortunately Chastillon's original drawings have been lost. Nevertheless, Françoise Boudon has argued that an examination of the work reveals that "Chastillon's topographical approach (his search for the best viewpoint, the measurement of distances, the pinpointing of characteristic features of the terrain and distinctive features of building etc)" ... has made it "apparent that these engravings, far from being whimsical and useless images, constitute the pages of a precise 'report' on France in the early 17th century."

The Topographie is a rare book with only about 15 extant copies, including all editions.

== Gallery ==
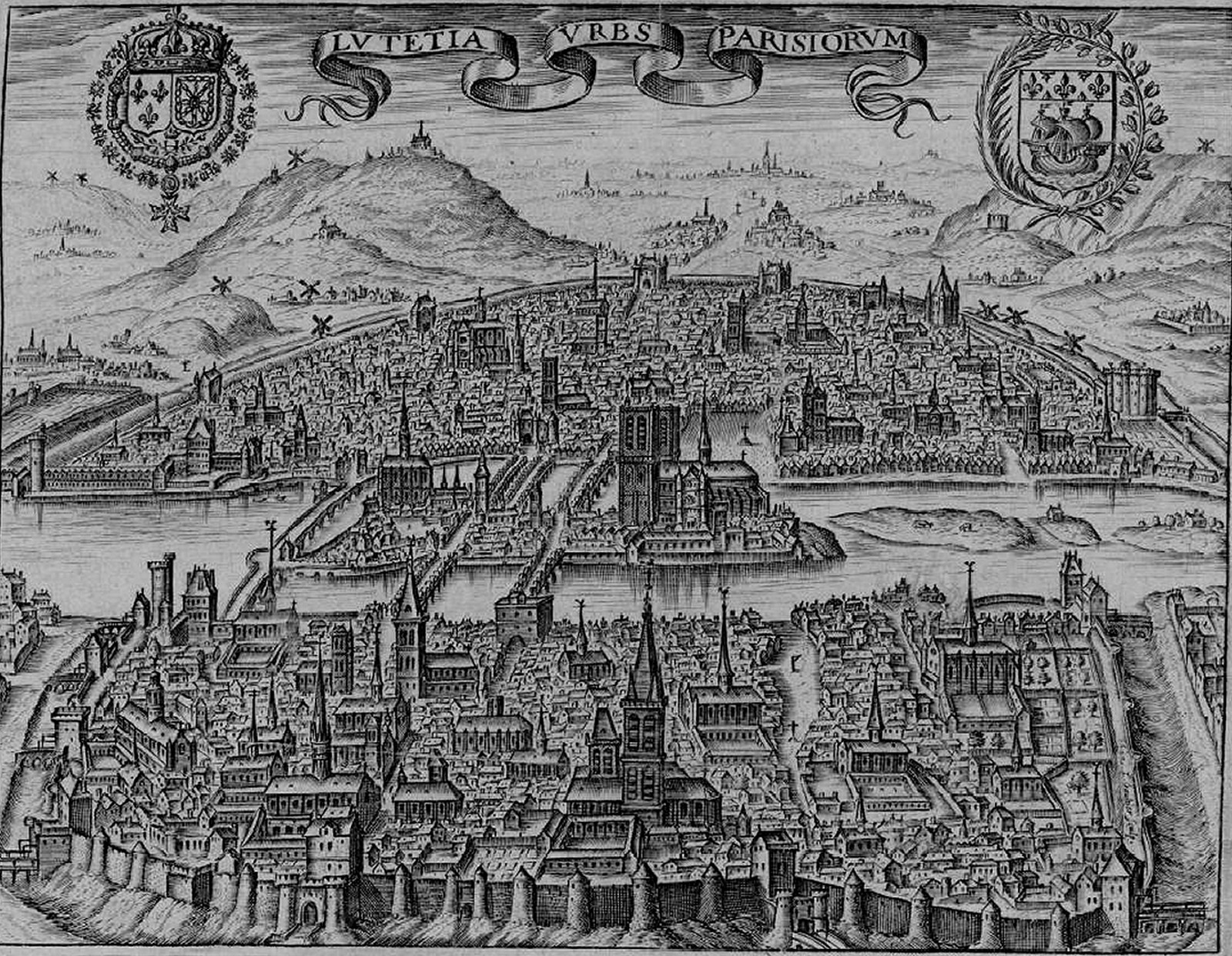
Paris ca. 1600

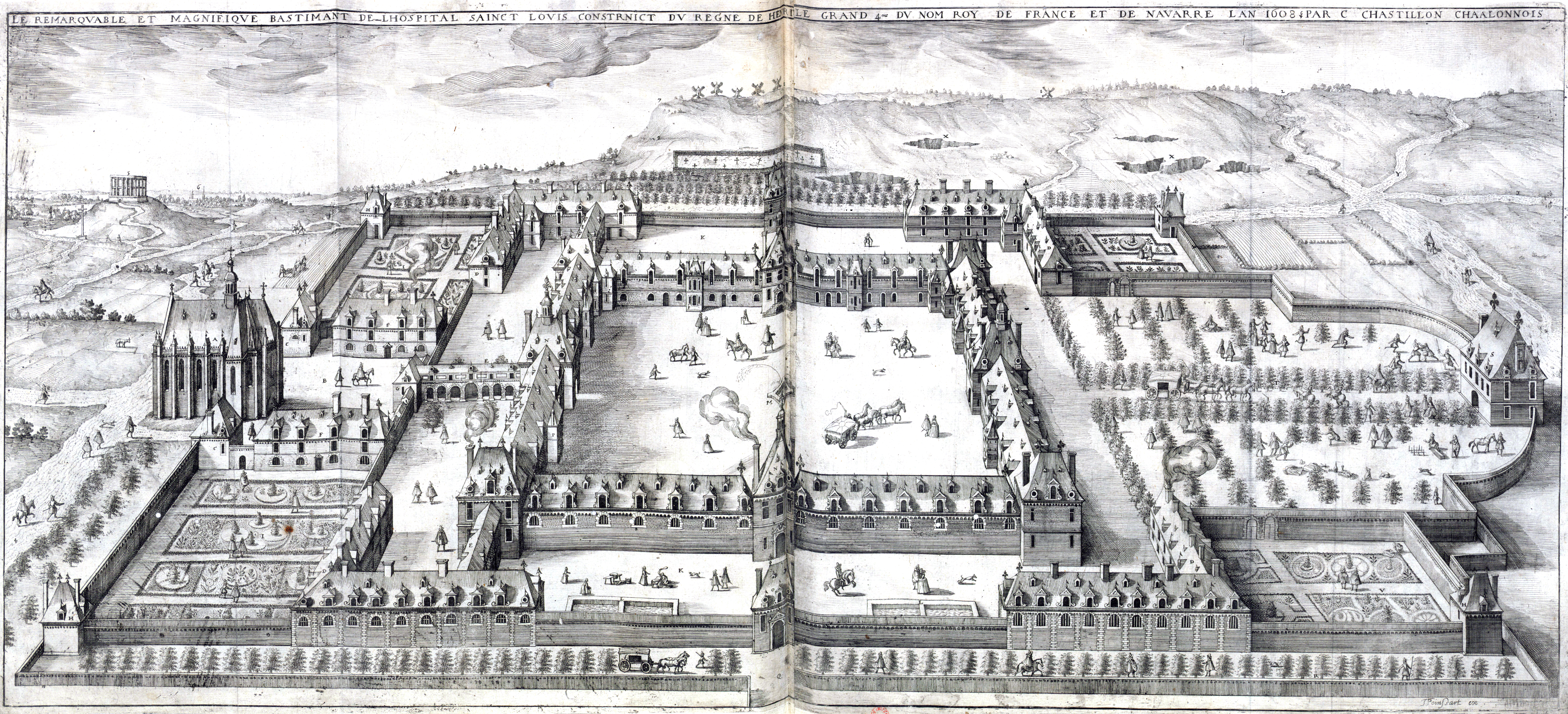
Hôpital Saint-Louis, 1608

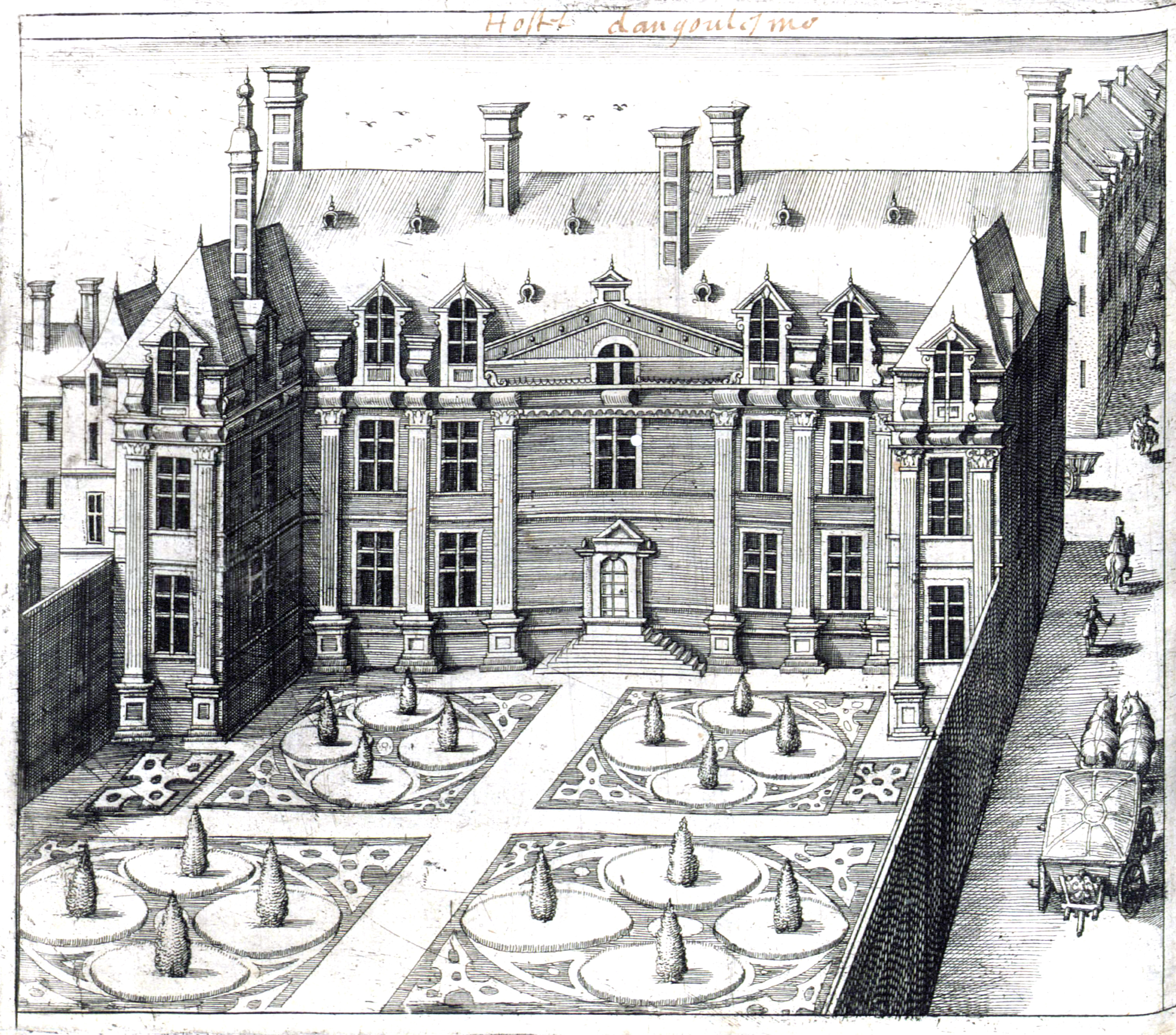
Hôtel d'Angoulême

== Bibliography ==
- Benezit Dictionary of Artists, vol. 3, p. 840 ("Chatillon, Claude"). Paris: Gründ. ISBN 9782700030709.
- Ballon, Hilary (1991). The Paris of Henri IV: Architecture and Urbanism. Cambridge, Massachusetts: The MIT Press. ISBN 978-0-262-02309-2.
- Boudon, Françoise (1996). "Chastillon, Claude", vol. 6, p. 503, in The Dictionary of Art, edited by Jane Turner, reprinted in 1998 with minor corrections. New York: Grove Dictionaries. ISBN 9781884446009.
- Lemerle, Frédérique (2014a). "Architectura – Books on Architecture: Topographie françoise..., Paris, J. Boisseau, 1641".
- Lemerle, Frédérique (2014b). "Architectura – Books on Architecture: Topographie françoise..., Paris, J. Boisseau, 1648".
- Lemerle, Frédérique (2014c). "Architectura – Books on Architecture: Topographie françoise..., Paris, L. Boissevin, 1655".
