= Rue des Francs-Bourgeois =

Street in Paris, France

- Location within Paris
- Length: 705 m (2,313 ft)
- Width: 8 to 13 m (26 to 43 ft)
- Arrondissement: 3rd, 4th
- Quarter: Marais
- Coordinates: 48°51′25.56″N 2°21′43.98″E
- From: 19 Place des Vosges
- To: 56 Rue des Archives

Construction
- Completion: 1868
- Denomination: 1500

The Rue des Francs-Bourgeois (pronounced [ʁy de fʁɑ̃ buʁʒwa]) is one of the longer streets in the Marais district of Paris, France.

Starting near the Centre Georges Pompidou (Rue Rambuteau), the road is considered trendy, with numerous fashion boutiques. The Rue des Francs-Bourgeois is one of the few streets which largely ignores France's strong tradition of Sunday closure, even within Paris. As such, it is a popular location for weekend brunches and walks. Notable buildings include the ancient hôtels Carnavalet, Lamoignon, Sandreville, d'Albret, d'Alméras, Poussepin, de Coulanges, Hérouet, de Jaucourt, de Fontenay, de Breteuil and de Soubise. Hôtel Carnavalet houses the museum of the history of Paris.

== History ==
The street was once known as the Rue des Poulies. In 1415, a noble called le Mazurier offered the Chief Prior of France a huge private mansion with 24 bedrooms to receive 48 poor people. These people were so poor that they did not pay the city's taxes, and were called francs-bourgeois. In 1868, the street was joined with the Rue Neuve Saint-Catherine and the Rue du Paradis-au-Marais.

Jack Kerouac facetiously translated the name as "street of the outspoken middle class".

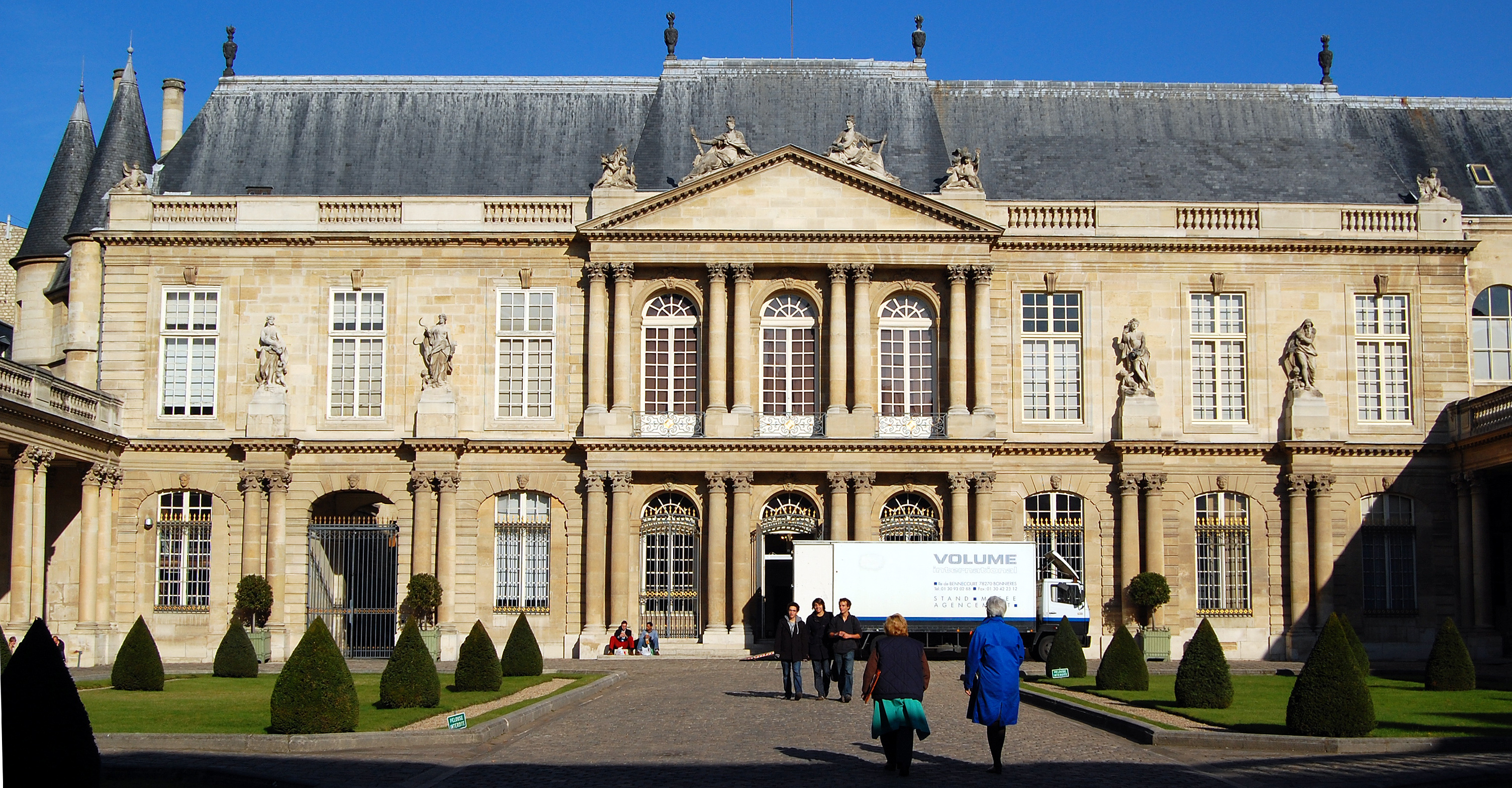
Hôtel de Soubise at no. 60

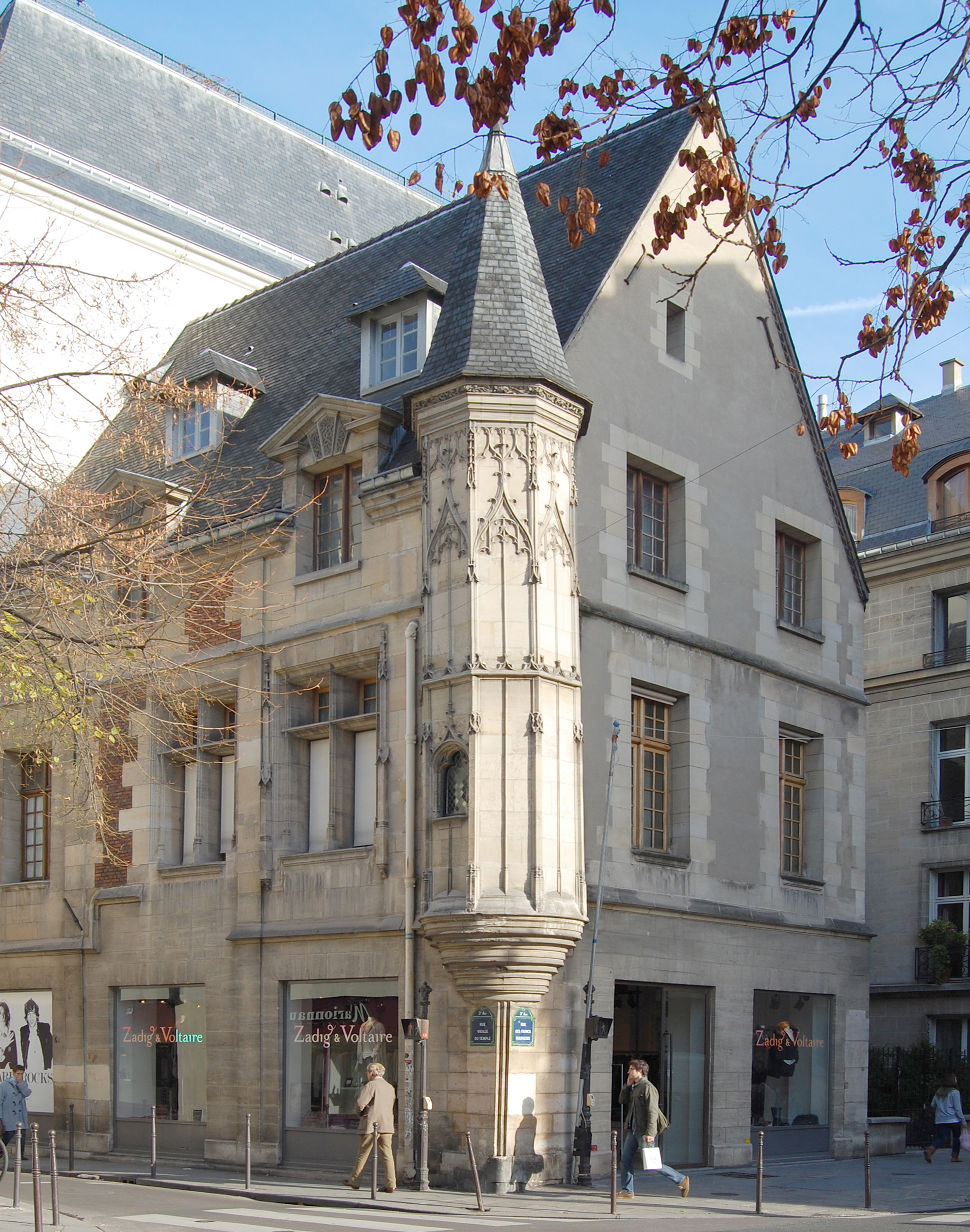
Maison de Jean Herouet at no. 54

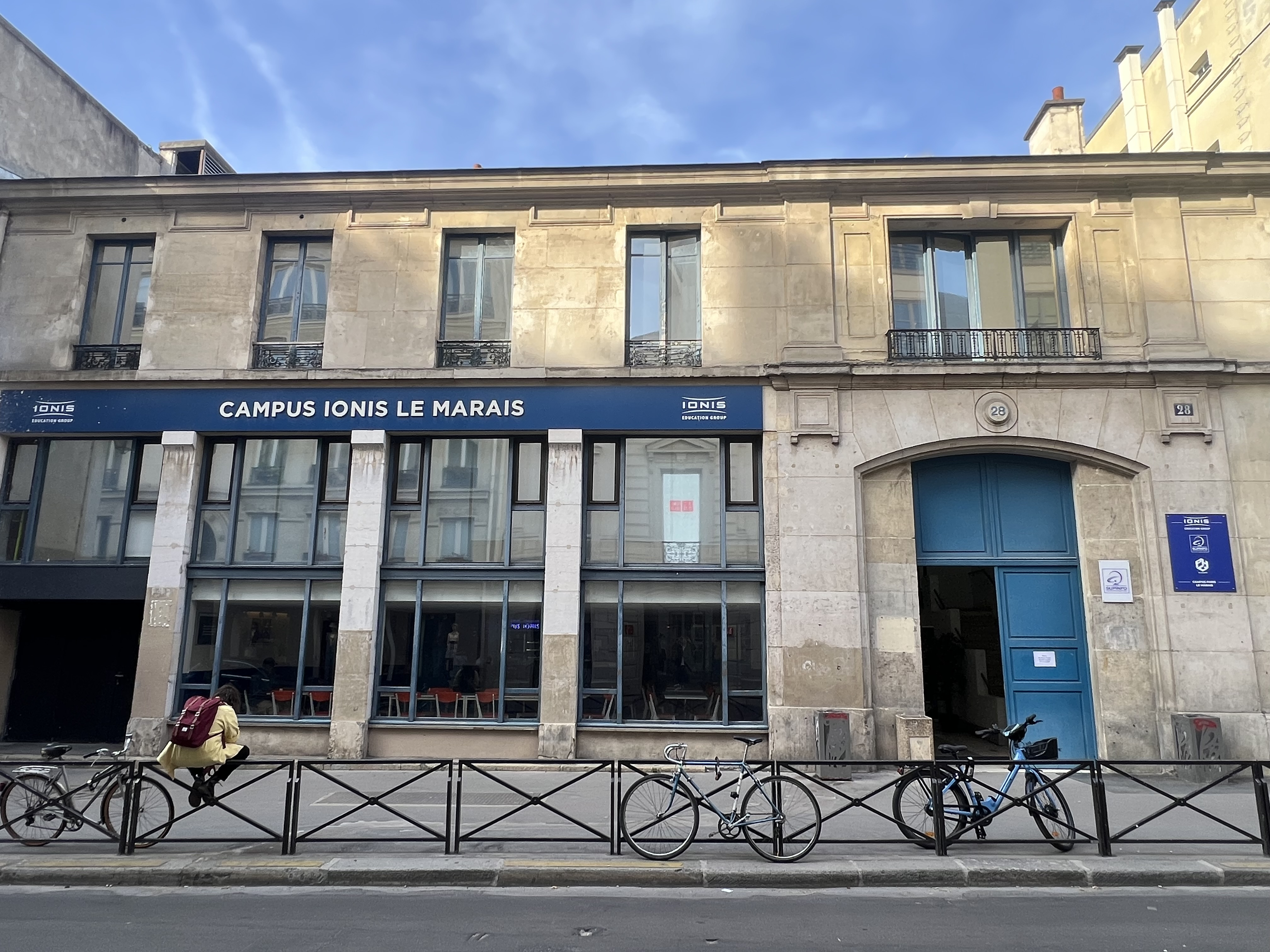
IONIS Education Group at no. 28

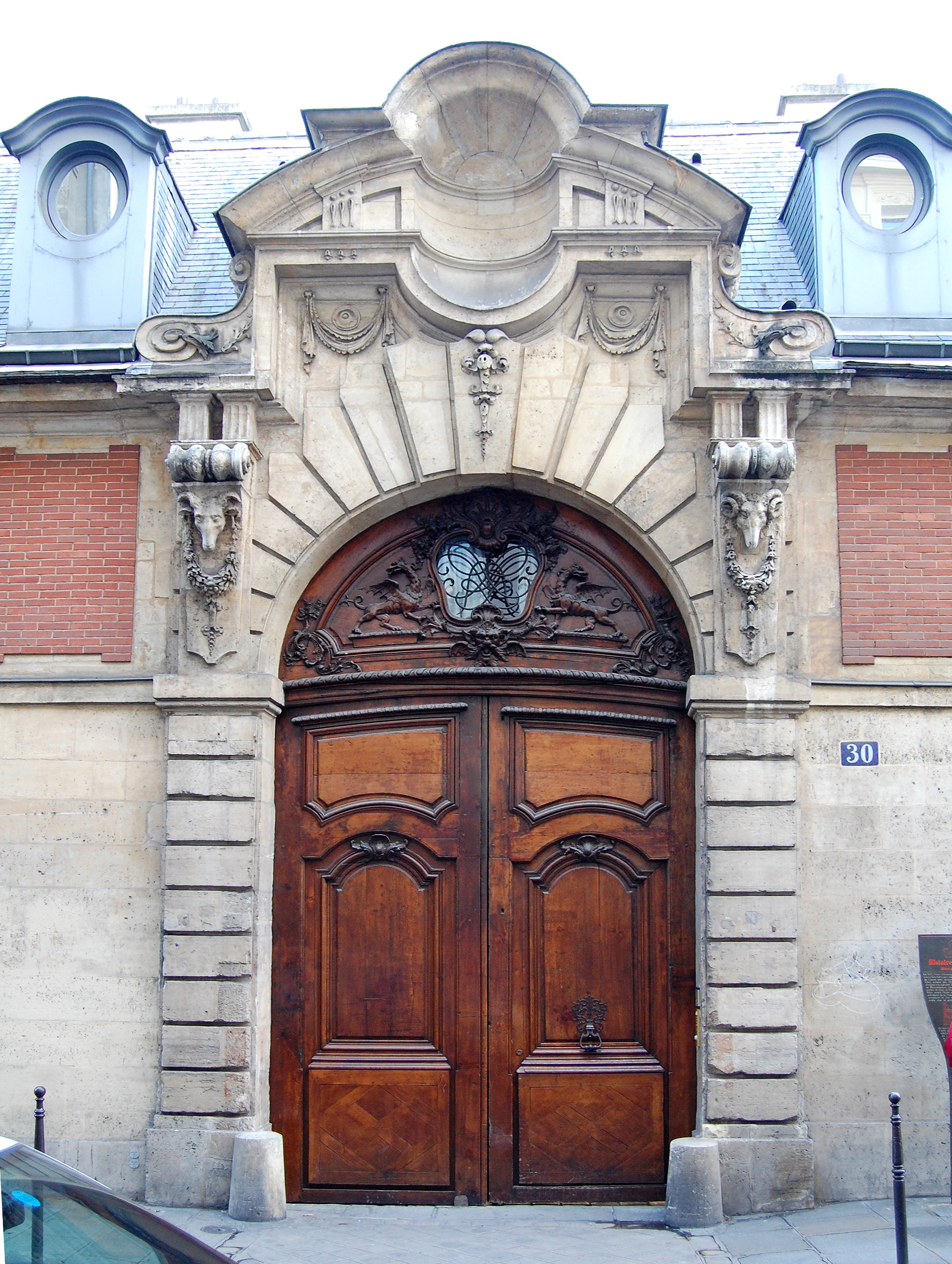
Entrance to the Hôtel d'Almeras at no. 30

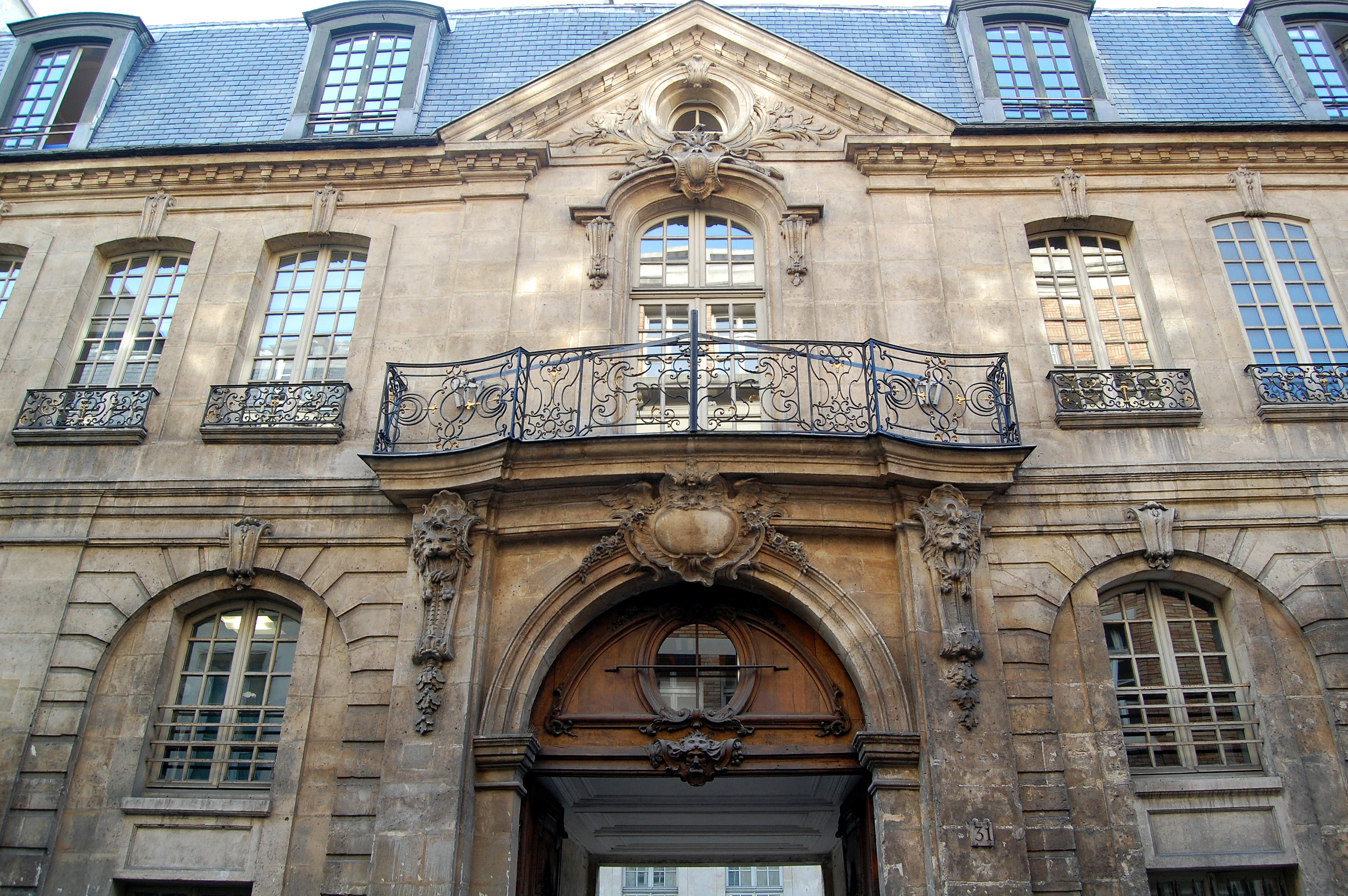
Entrance to the Hôtel d'Albret at no. 31

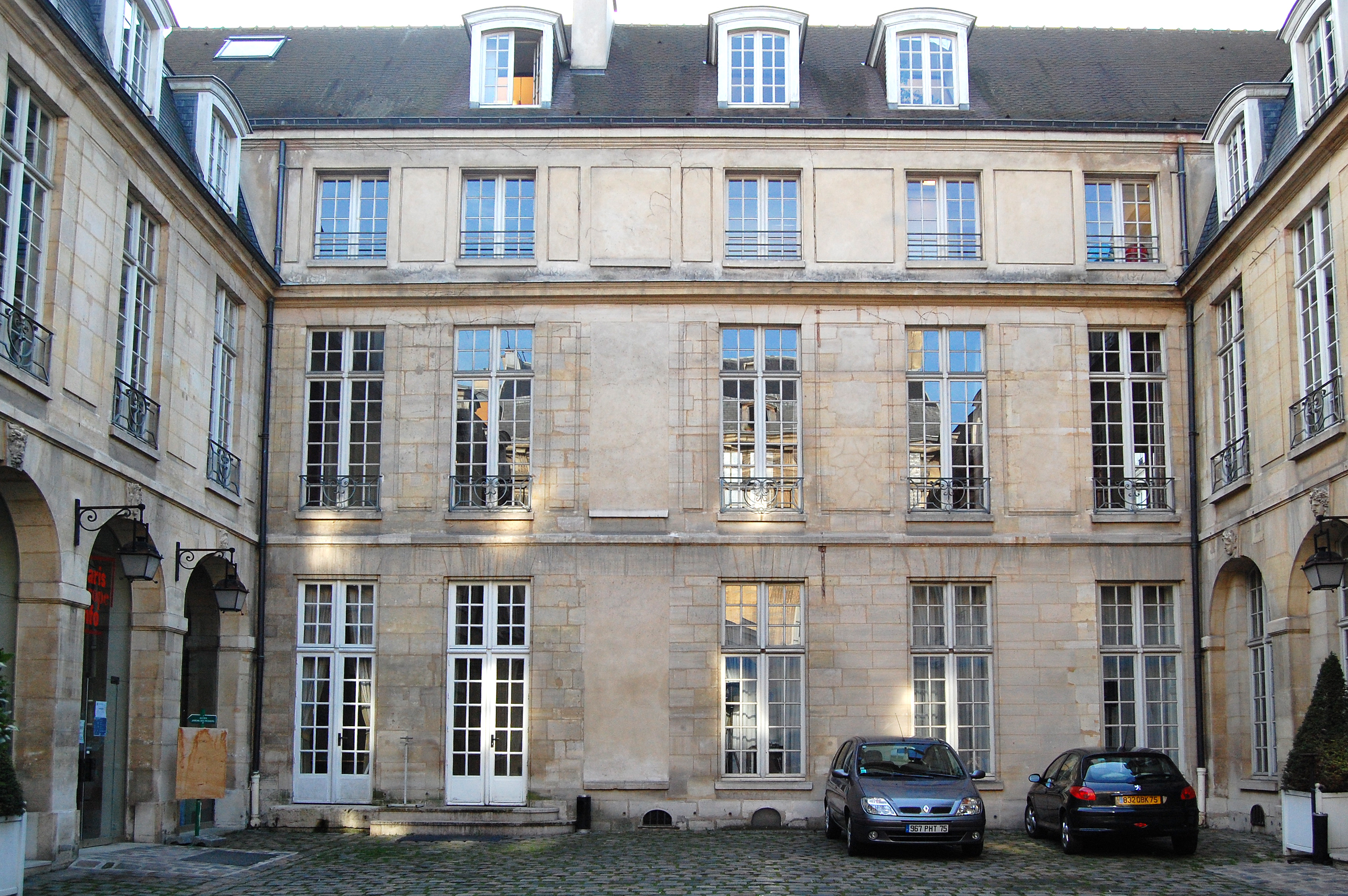
Hôtel de Coulanges at no. 37

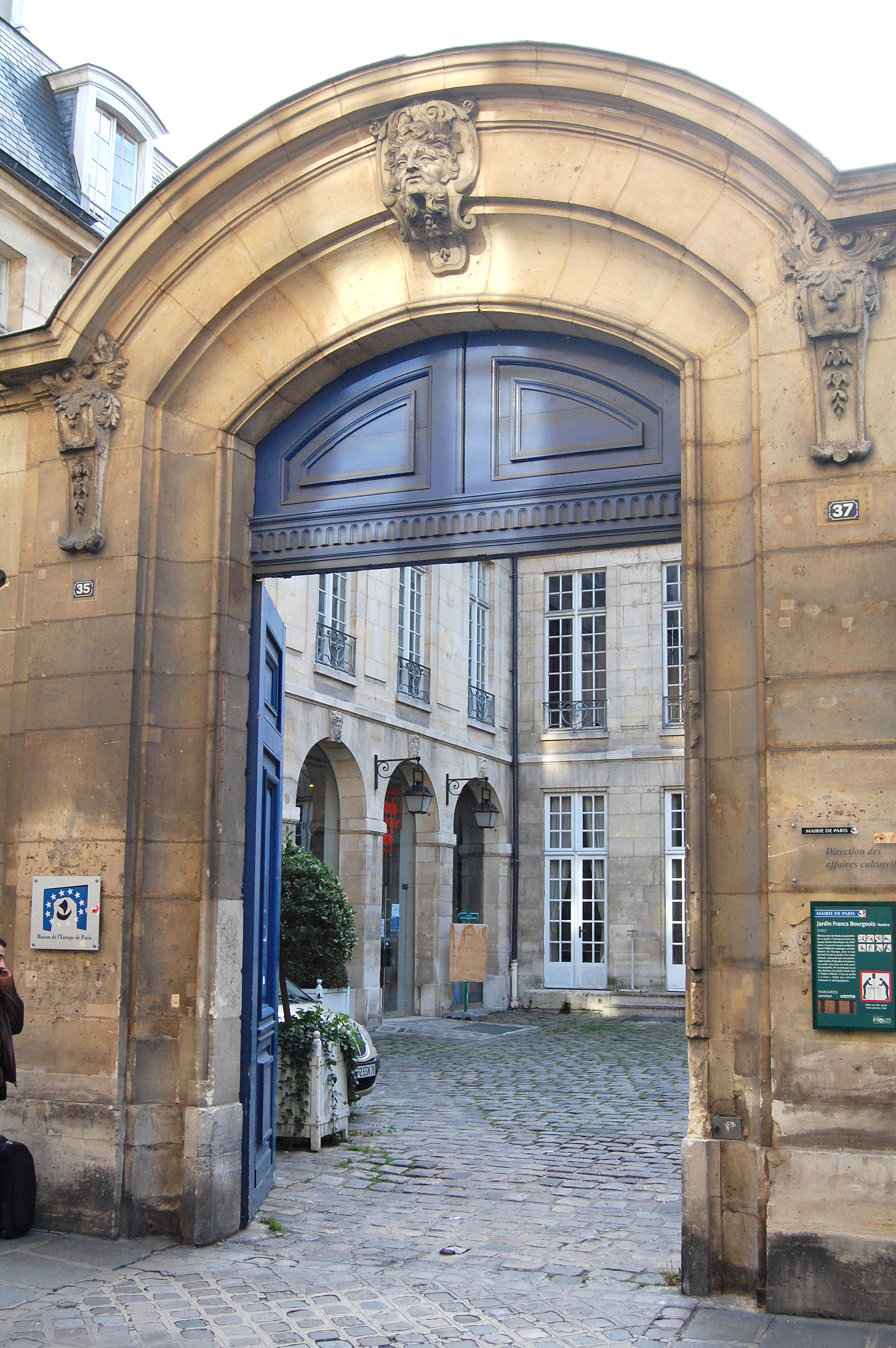
Entrance to the Hôtel de Coulanges
