= Seyidlər =

Seyidlər or Seidlyar or Seyidlar or Seyidler or Seydlyar or Sejidler or Seytlar may refer to:

- Seyidlər, Kalbajar, Azerbaijan
- Seyidlər, Khachmaz, Azerbaijan
- Seyidlər, Lachin, Azerbaijan
- Seyidlər, Neftchala, Azerbaijan
- Seyidlər, Saatly, Azerbaijan
- Seyidlər, Salyan, Azerbaijan
- Seyidlər, Samukh, Azerbaijan
- Seyidlər, Zangilan, Azerbaijan
- Seyidlər, Zardab

- Aşağı Seyidlər, Azerbaijan

- Yuxarı Seyidlər, Azerbaijan
- Şeidlər, Azerbaijan
- Seidlyar, Iran
