= Métezeau =

Métezeau is a surname. Notable people with the surname include:

- Clément II Métezeau (1581–1652), French architect, brother of Louis
- Jean Métezeau (?–1600), French architect, brother of Thibault
- Louis Métezeau (1559–1615), French architect
- Thibault Métezeau (1533–1596), French architect
