= Lyuksemburg (disambiguation) =

Lyuksemburg is a village in Russia.

Lyuksemburg may also refer to:

- Lyuksemburg, Kyrgyzstan, village in Kyrgyzstan
- Vladimir Lyuksemburg (1888–1971), Russian politician

== See also ==
- Luxembourg (disambiguation)
