= Qaraağaclı =

- Municipality
- Location within Azerbaijan
- Coordinates: 40°56′23″N 46°22′44″E
- Country: Azerbaijan
- Rayon: Samukh
- Elevation: 90 m (300 ft)

Population (2008)
  - Total: 2,319
- Time zone: UTC+4 (AZT)

Qaraağaclı, Qırmızı Samux (?-2018) is a village and municipality in the Samukh Rayon of Azerbaijan. Nearby towns are:

Luksemburq Yukhary Karasakkal Kirov Sejidlar Sariqamis Burunqovaq	2.2 km 7.4 km 7.6 km 11.3 km 13.1 km 18.0 km	to the west to the east to the east to the south to the south to the north

It has a population of 2,319.
