= Luxembourg (disambiguation) =

Luxembourg, officially the Grand Duchy of Luxembourg, is a sovereign country in western Europe.

Luxembourg or Luxemburg may also refer to:

== Places ==
=== Luxembourg ===
- Luxembourg City, the capital city
- Luxembourg District, one of the three districts of Luxembourg
- Luxembourg (canton), one subdivision of Luxembourg district
- County of Luxemburg, a state of the Holy Roman Empire
- Duchy of Luxemburg, a state of the Holy Roman Empire
- Luxembourg (European Parliament constituency), a constituency in the European Parliament

=== Belgium ===
- Luxembourg (Belgium), a province of Wallonia, Belgium
- Place du Luxembourg, a square in Brussels

=== France ===
- Luxembourg Garden, in Paris
- Luxembourg Palace, located inside the Luxembourg Garden
- Musée du Luxembourg, in Paris
- Luxembourg station (Paris), on RER line B
- The 6th arrondissement of Paris, officially titled Luxembourg and containing the palace and gardens above

=== United States ===
- Luxemburg, Iowa
- Luxemburg, Wisconsin
- Luxemburg Township, Stearns County, Minnesota

== People ==
- Christoph Luxenberg, pseudonymous author
- François-Henri de Montmorency, duc de Luxembourg (1628–1695), Marshal of France
- Rosa Luxemburg (born Rosalia Luxemburg; 1871–1919), Polish-German Marxist revolutionary
- Vladimir Lyuksemburg (1888–1971), Russian Communist, member of the first Bolshevik government of Ukraine
- Rut Blees Luxemburg (born 1967), German photographer
- Wilhelmus Luxemburg (1929–2018), American mathematician
- House of Luxembourg, a medieval German royal family

== Music ==
- Luxembourg (album), an album by the English band The Bluetones
- Luxembourg (band), a British five-piece indie band
- "Luxembourg", a song by Elvis Costello on his album Trust

== Other ==
- Luxembourg (horse), Thoroughbred racehorse

== See also ==
- Luxembourgish language, a language that is spoken mainly in Luxembourg
- Lüksemburq, Azerbaijan
- Lyuksemburg, Dagestan, Russia
- Category:National sports teams of Luxembourg, teams called "Luxembourg"
