= Sarıqamış =

Sarıqamış may refer to:

- Sarıqamış, Neftchala, Azerbaijan
- Sarıqamış, Samukh, Azerbaijan
- Sarıkamış, Turkey
