= Place Ducale =

Square in Charleville-Mézières, France

Coordinates: 49.7735°N 4.7209°E

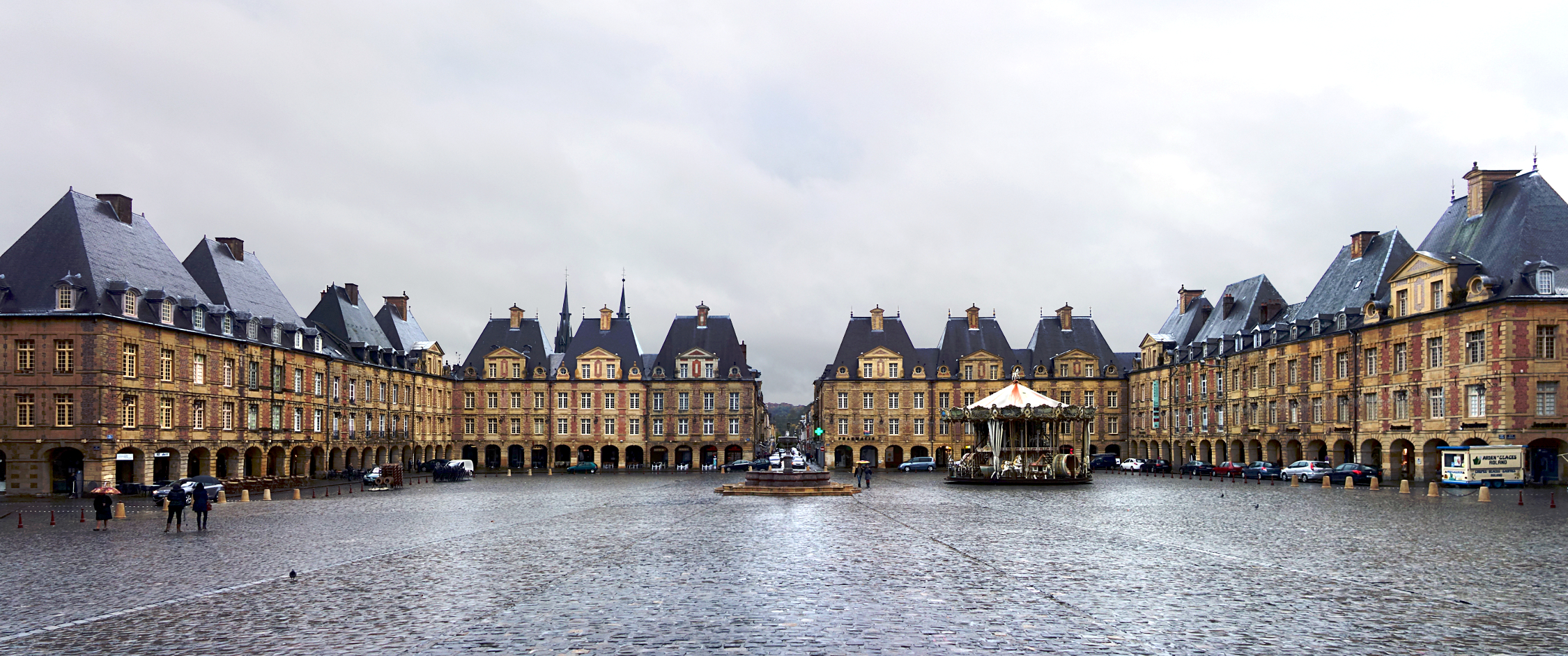
Place Ducale in Charleville-Mézières

Place Ducale is the central and historical main square of Charleville, the northern part of Charleville-Mézières, in the Ardennes department of France.

The history of the square goes back to 1606, when it was planned as the centre of the new town Charleville, founded by Charles I Gonzaga, Duke of Mantua. Duke Charles commissioned architect Clément II Métezeau to make the plans for the square. He was the younger brother of Louis Métezeau, who might have designed Place des Vosges in Paris; the similarity between the two squares is striking.

The square consists of three symmetrical sides, each one centred around a central pavilion, originally with a dome. On the fourth side the Duke originally intended to erect a palace for himself, but this was never built. Instead, the present-day town hall, erected with a bell tower in 1840, partially occupies the fourth side.
