= Thibault Métezeau =

French architect (1533–1596)

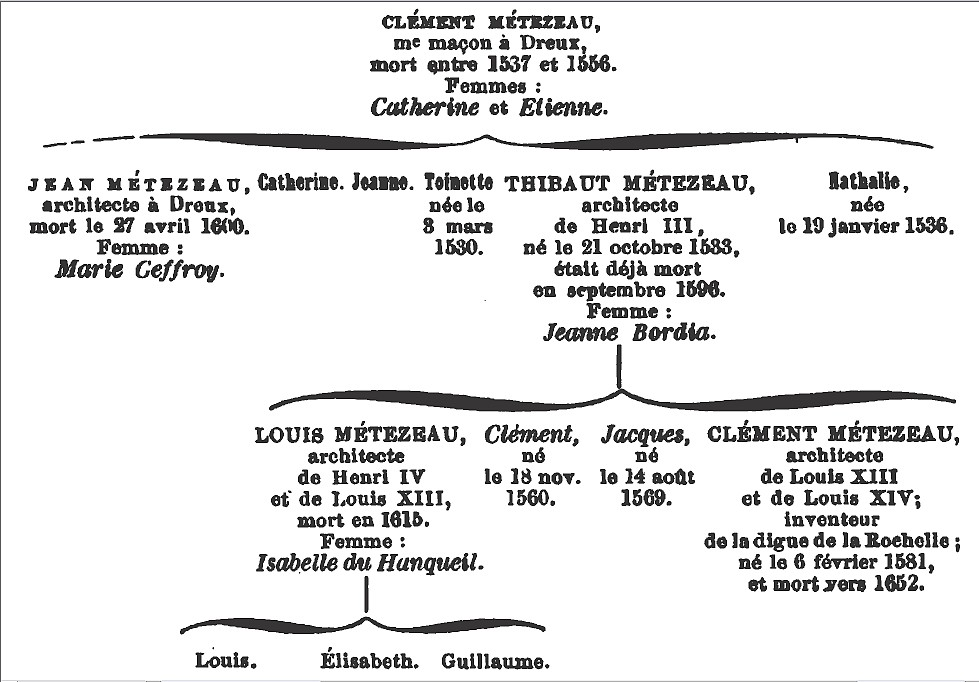
- Métezeau family
- Born: 21 October 1533; Dreux
- Died: 1580s Paris
- Children: Clément II Métezeau

Thibault Métezeau or Thibaut Métezeau (born 21 October 1533 at Dreux – died before 18 December 1586 in Paris) was a French architect. He was the son of Clément Métezeau, master mason and father of architects Louis and Clément II Métezeau. He was the younger brother of Jean Métezeau, also an architect.

== Biography ==
He spent the first part of his life in Dreux until 1569, when he moved to Paris, where he worked on the Tuileries Palace under Philibert de L'Orme, on the Valois chapel at the Basilica of Saint-Denis (1572–1582), and from 1578 as one of the contractors on the Pont Neuf. He was still in charge of work on the Pont Neuf in 1582.

He was quoted as architect to the Duke of Alençon in 1576, then appointed architect to king Henri III on 25 March 1578.

He has been suggested as possibly the initial designer of the Hôtel de Nevers on the Left Bank (1580), and the design of the Hôtel d'Angoulême (1585) has also been attributed to him.

In 1585, he realized the avant-portail of the Porte Saint-Antoine. The historian of Paris Henri Sauval, writing around 1650 but published in 1724, attributed to him the design of the Salle des Antiques (Antiquities Room) in the Grande Galerie of the Palais du Louvre, although construction is not believed to have begun until 1595 under his son Louis Métezeau.
