= First Architect to the King =

Under the Ancien Régime, the First Architect to the King (French: Premier Architecte du Roi, pronounced [pʁəmje aʁʃitɛktə dy ʁwa]) was the direct assistant to the general director of the building industries, arts and manufactures of France and, consequently, number 2 of the Bâtiments du Roi, forming part of the Secretary of State of the Maison du Roi.

== Responsibilities ==
The Premier Architecte du Roi was, in theory, in charge of the works of maîtrise d'œuvre on behalf of the building industries of King. Hence, Ange-Jacques Gabriel was in charge of the design of the Place de la Concorde chosen from the best ideas submitted to the contest by the participants.

But this position entailed especially important administrative responsibilities, in this capacity of master builder of the projects ordered by the Bâtiments du Roi: it had the responsibilities of arranging the construction contracts for the contractors and the craftsmen, of supervising the management of supply stores (marbles, leads, etc.), of inspecting the building sites, of proceeding the reception of the works, etc.

== Organization ==
The Premier architecte du Roi was assisted by general intendants and controllers, draughtsmen, a general inspector – all selected among the most distinguished architects, generally members of the Académie royale d'architecture. Il was disposed also of accounting officers and clerks. It had the supervision of the stewardship of Water and Fontaines, charged since the 17th century by the family of Francine.

== Chronological list of Premiers Architectes du Roi ==
- ? -1615: Louis Métezeau
- 1639–1653: Jacques Lemercier
- 1653–1670: Louis Le Vau
- 1681–1708: Jules Hardouin-Mansart
- 1708–1734: Robert de Cotte
- 1734–1742: Jacques V Gabriel
- 1742–1775: Ange-Jacques Gabriel
- 1775–1777: Richard Mique

== See also ==
- Bâtiments du Roi
