= Louis Métezeau =

French architect (1559–1615)

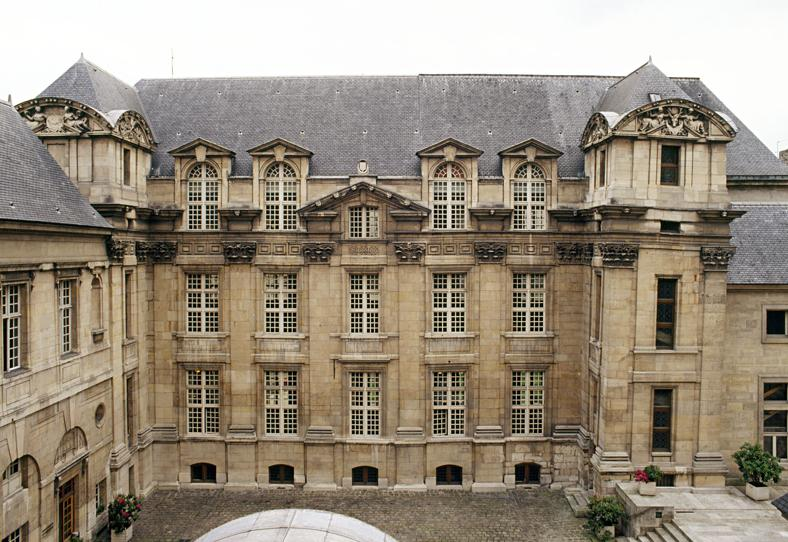
Court facade of the Hôtel d'Angoulême

Louis Métezeau (1559 – 18 August 1615) was a French architect.

== Life and career ==
Métezeau was born in Dreux, Eure-et-Loir, and died in Paris. He was the son of Thibault Métezeau, the brother of Clément II Métezeau and the nephew of Jean Métezeau. The register of the city of Dreux refers to him as architecte du roi et contrôleur des bâtiments royaux.

Métezeau probably undertook the construction of the Grande Galerie of the Louvre (the eastern section is traditionally attributed to him) and may have designed the Petite Galerie. He may also have conceived the Place des Vosges in Paris. An archival discovery of 1984 led some historians to name Louis Métezeau as the architect of the Hôtel d'Angoulême. It is now suggested that Louis' father, Thibault Métezeau, more likely designed it.

Métezeau was probably involved in the building of the Palais du Luxembourg for Marie de Medicis: she is believed to have sent him to Florence in 1611 to make drawings of the Palazzo Pitti, which was to be used as a model by the regent's order.

At his death, Métezeau was identified as Premier Architecte du Roi of Henry IV of France.

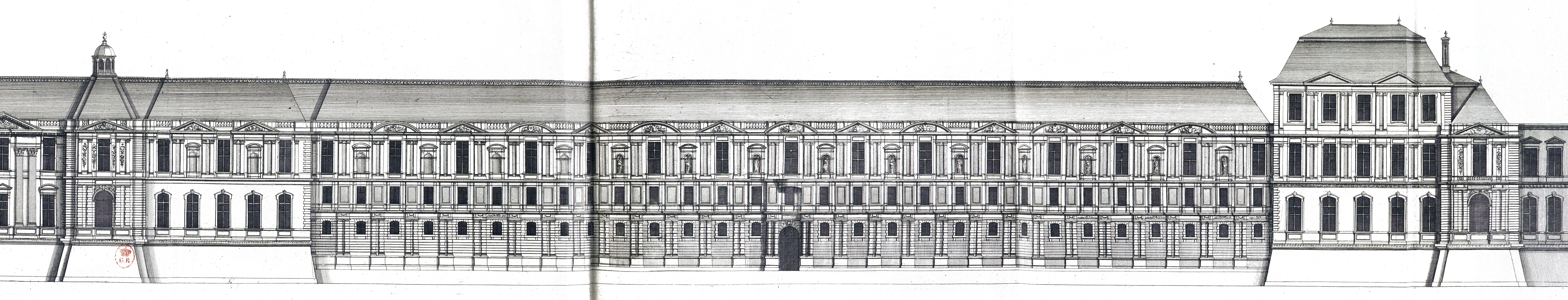
The eastern section of the Louvre's Grande Galerie, from an engraving by Jean Marot (c. 1670)

== Bibliography ==
- Ayers, Andrew (2004). The Architecture of Paris. Stuttgart; London: Edition Axel Menges. ISBN 9783930698967.
- Babelon, Jean-Pierre (1996). "Métezeau: (1) Louis Métezeau", vol. 21, p.p 345–346, in The Dictionary of Art, edited by Jane Turner, reprinted with minor corrections in 1998. ISBN 9781884446009. Also at Oxford Art Online.
- Ballon, Hilary (1991). The Paris of Henri IV: Architecture and Urbanism. Cambridge, Massachusetts: The MIT Press. ISBN 9780262023092.
- Gady, Alexandre (2008). Les hôtels particuliers de Paris, du Moyen-Âge à la Belle époque, Paris, Parigramme. 2012 edition: ISBN 9782840967040.
- Sturgis, Russell (1901). "Métezeau, Louis", vol. 2 (F–N), col. 868 in A Dictionary of Architecture and Building. New York: Macmillan.
- Thomson, David (1984). Renaissance Paris: Architecture and Growth, 1475-1600, Berkeley, University of California Press. ISBN 9780520053595.
