= Seyidlər, Neftchala =

Seyidlər
- Location within Azerbaijan
- Coordinates: 39°25′N 49°15′E
- Country: Azerbaijan
- Rayon: Neftchala
- Time zone: UTC+4 (AZT)
  - Summer (DST): UTC+5 (AZT)

Seyidlər (also, Seidlyar and Seytlar) is a village in the Neftchala Rayon of Azerbaijan.
