= Aşağı Seyidlər =

- Municipality
- Location within Azerbaijan
- Coordinates: 40°07′20″N 47°50′54″E
- Country: Azerbaijan
- Rayon: Zardab

Population
  - Total: 748
- Time zone: UTC+4 (AZT)
  - Summer (DST): UTC+5 (AZT)

Aşağı Seyidlər (also, Seyidlər, Seidlyar, and Sendlyar) is a village and municipality in the Zardab Rayon of Azerbaijan. It has a population of 748.
