= Seyidlər, Zangilan =

Seyidlər
- Location within Azerbaijan
- Coordinates: 39°11′55″N 46°30′42″E
- Country: Azerbaijan
- District: Zangilan
- Time zone: UTC+4 (AZT)
  - Summer (DST): UTC+5 (AZT)

Seyidlər (Seyidlar) is a village in the Zangilan District of Azerbaijan.
