= Seyidlər, Salyan =

Seyidlər
- Municipality
- Location within Azerbaijan
- Coordinates: 39°26′38″N 48°50′40″E
- Country: Azerbaijan
- Rayon: Salyan

Population
  - Total: 770
- Time zone: UTC+4 (AZT)
  - Summer (DST): UTC+5 (AZT)

Seyidlər (also, Seyidlar and Seidlyar) is a village and municipality in the Salyan Rayon of Azerbaijan. It has a population of 770.
