= Clément II Métezeau =

French engineer (1581–1652)

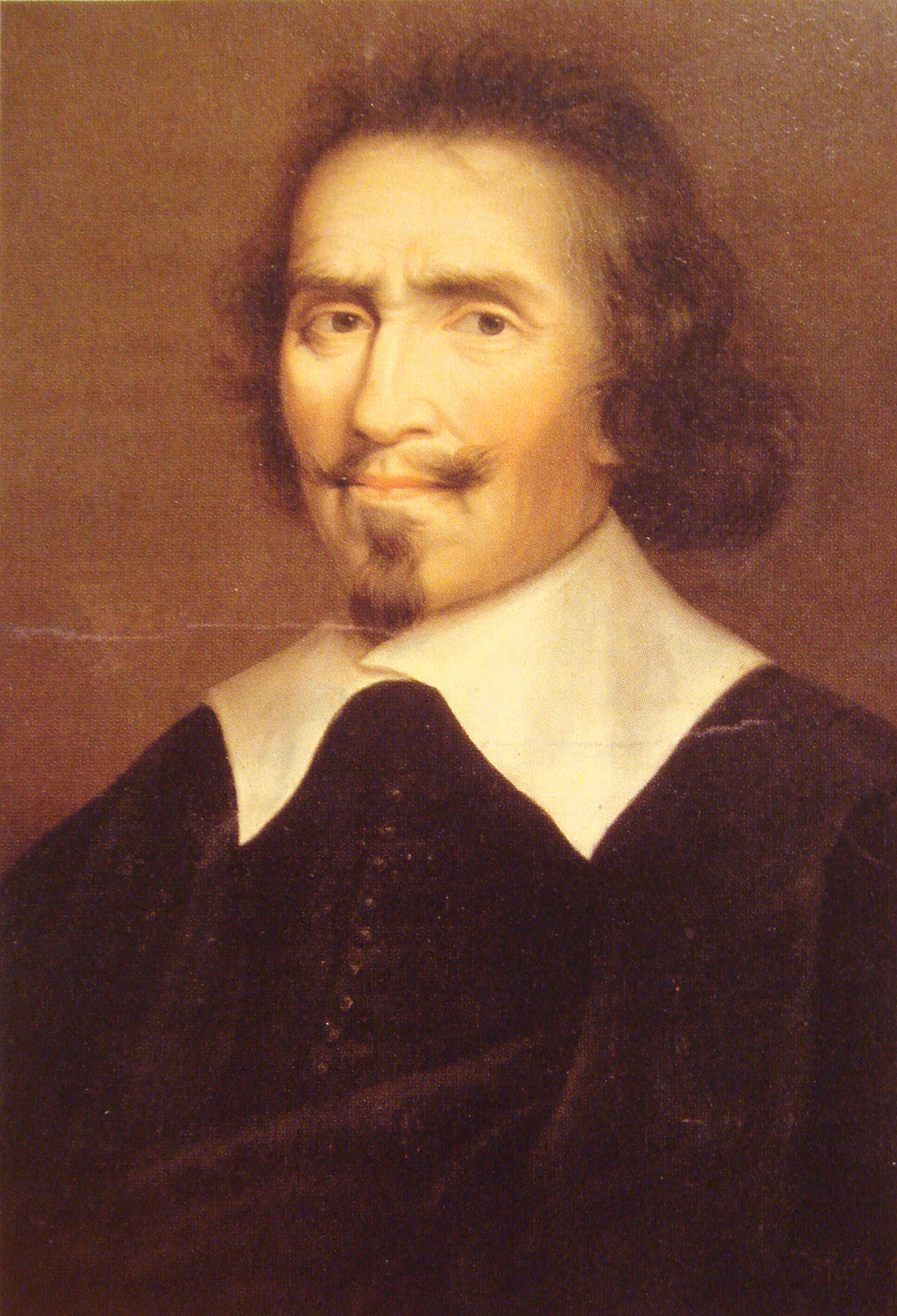
Clément II Métezeau (1581-1652).

Jacques-Clément Métezeau (French pronunciation: [klemɑ̃ metəzo]; 1581–1652), also Clément II Métezeau, was Royal architect of Louis XIII, and French engineer who completed the seawall blocking the city of La Rochelle in the Siege of La Rochelle in 1627–1628. He also designed Place Ducale, the main square in Charleville-Mézières, in 1606.

The initial idea for blocking the channel leading to the harbour of La Rochelle in order to stop all supplies to the city came from the Italian engineer Pompeo Targone, but his structure was broken by the winter weather. The endeavour was finally taken up by the Royal architect Clément Métezeau (also Metzeau).

The wall was built on top of a foundation made of sunken hulks, filled with rubble. The construction involved 4,000 workmen, and the seawall was 1,400 metres long. French artillery installed on the seawall and used against English ships that tried to supply the city.

Métezeau may have been involved in the building of the Palais du Luxembourg for Marie de Medicis. According to Collins, he was sent to Florence by the main architect Salomon de Brosse to make drawings of the Palazzo Pitti, which was to be used as a model by the regent's order. However, other sources say Marie de Medicis sent his brother, Louis Métezeau.

Clément Métezeau also built the Classical facade of the Église Saint-Gervais-Saint-Protais of Paris, in 1621, as well as two townhouses (hôtels particuliers) in Paris, the Hôtel de Chevreuse (rue Saint-Thomas-du-Louvre), constructed 1622–1623 and renamed Hôtel de Longueville in 1662, and the Hôtel du Plessis-Guénégaud, constructed 1630–1632.

== Gallery ==
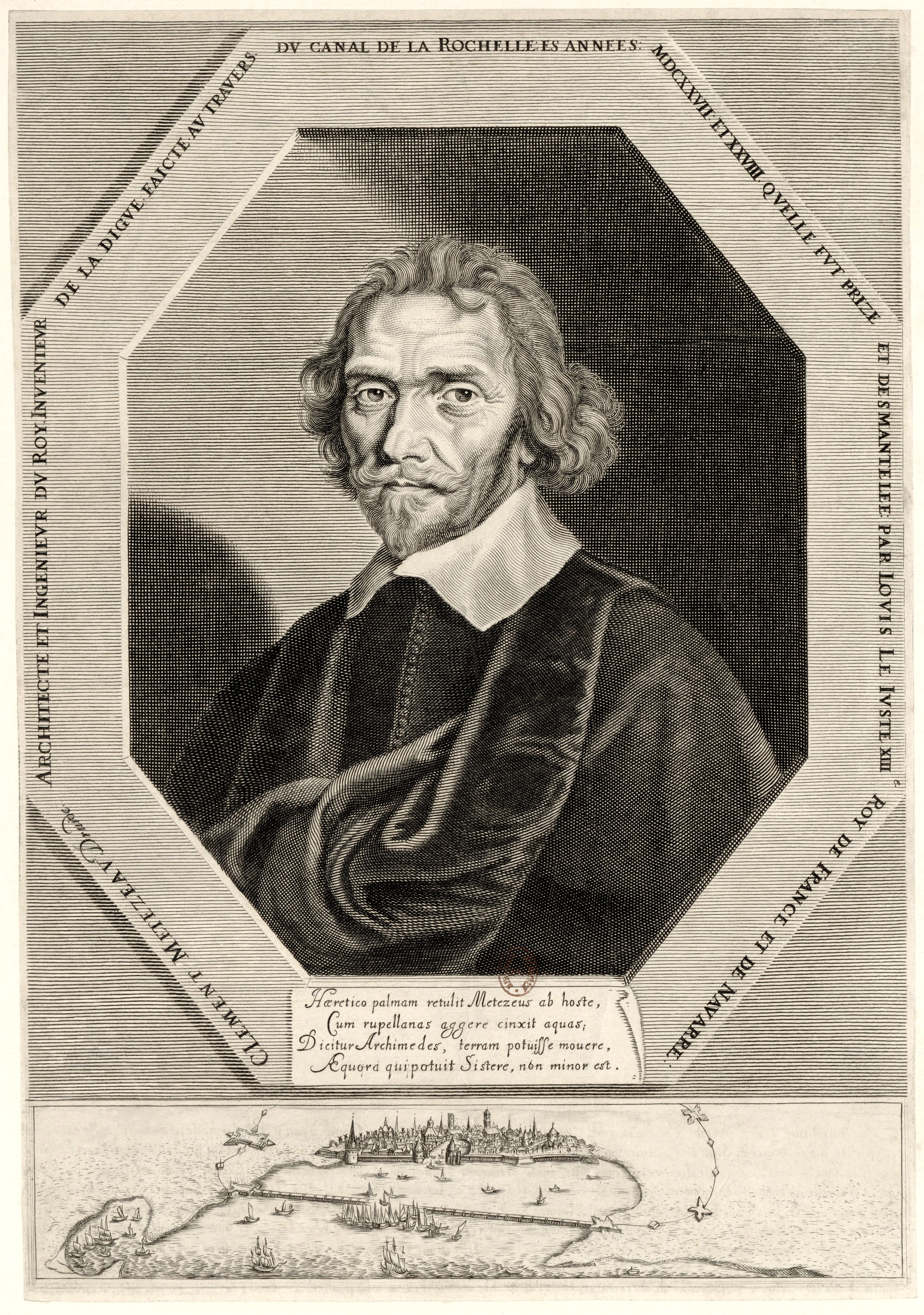
Clément Métezeau and the siege of La Rochelle

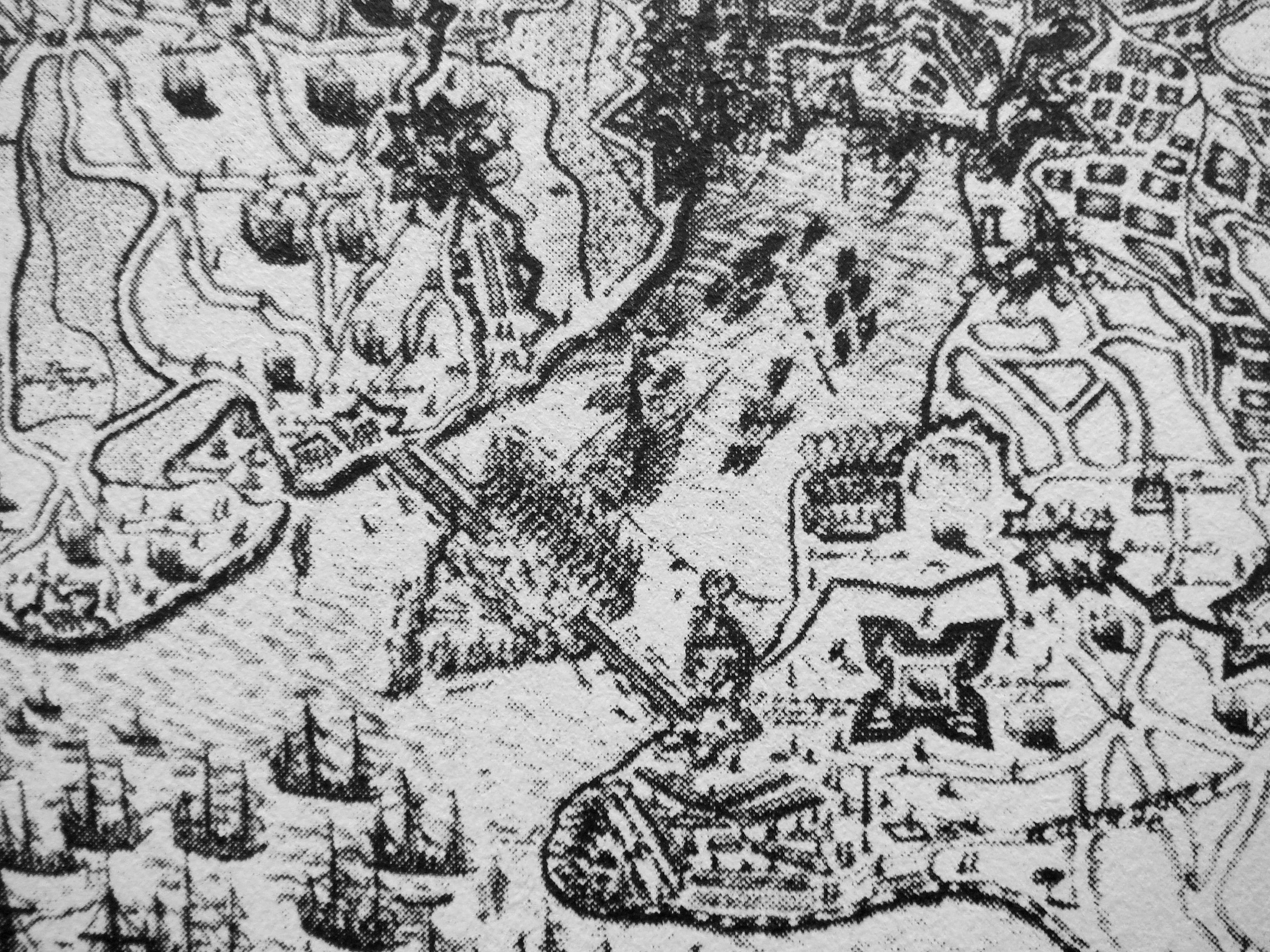
The seawall designed by Clément Métezeau for the Siege of La Rochelle

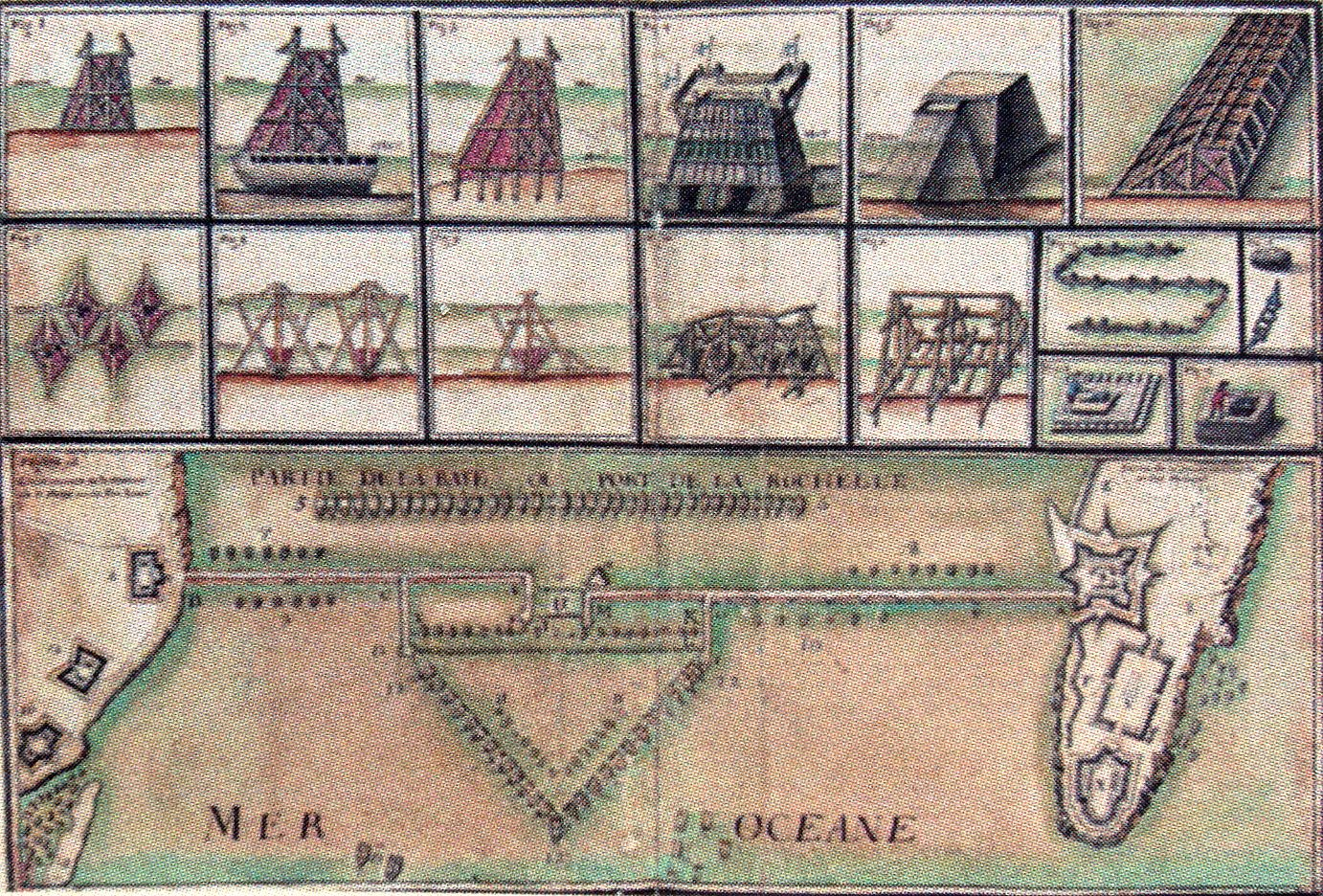
The Métezeau seawall at the Siege of La Rochelle
