= Lyuksemburg, Kyrgyzstan =

Lyuksemburg Люксембург
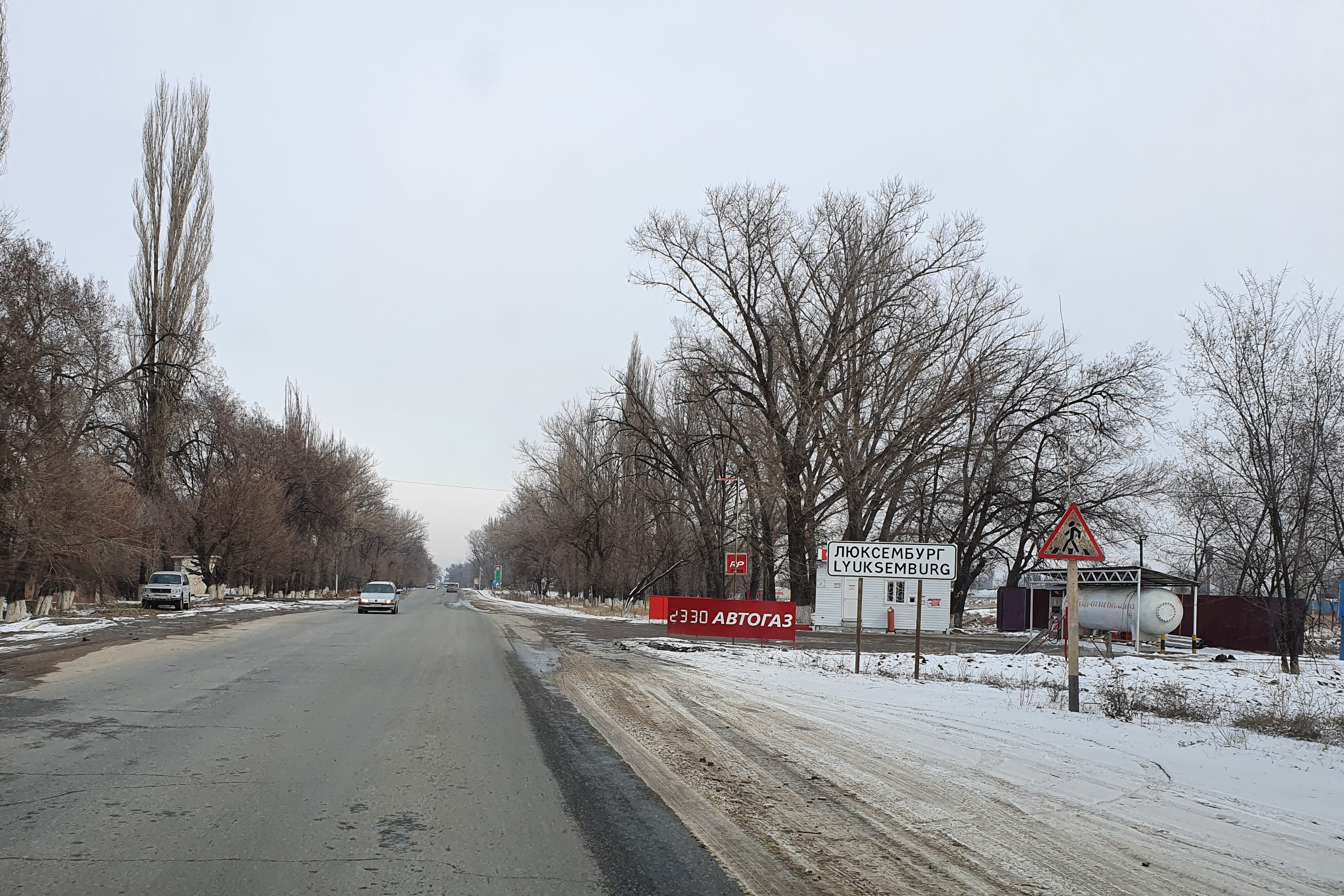
- Entrance to Lyuksemburg village

- Location within Kyrgyzstan
- Coordinates: 42°53′20″N 74°49′50″E
- Country: Kyrgyzstan
- Region: Chüy
- District: Ysyk-Ata

Population (2021)
  - Total: 5,528
- Time zone: UTC+6

Lyuksemburg (Kyrgyz: Люксембург) is a village in Chüy Region of Kyrgyzstan. It is part of the Ysyk-Ata District. Its population was 5,528 in 2021. It lies adjacent to the west of the city Kant, and 17 km east of Bishkek.

== Population ==
Historical population
Year	Pop.	±% p.a.
2009	4,559	—
2021	5,528	+1.62%
Note: resident population; Sources:
