= Yuxarı Seyidlər =

- Municipality
- Location within Azerbaijan
- Coordinates: 40°21′40″N 47°30′50″E
- Country: Azerbaijan
- Rayon: Zardab

Population
  - Total: 756
- Time zone: UTC+4 (AZT)
  - Summer (DST): UTC+5 (AZT)

Yuxarı Seyidlər is a village and municipality in the Zardab Rayon of Azerbaijan. It has a population of 755.
