= Luxembourg Palace =

Seat of the Senate of France in Paris

Coordinates: 48°50′54″N 2°20′14″E

- Palais du Luxembourg (French)
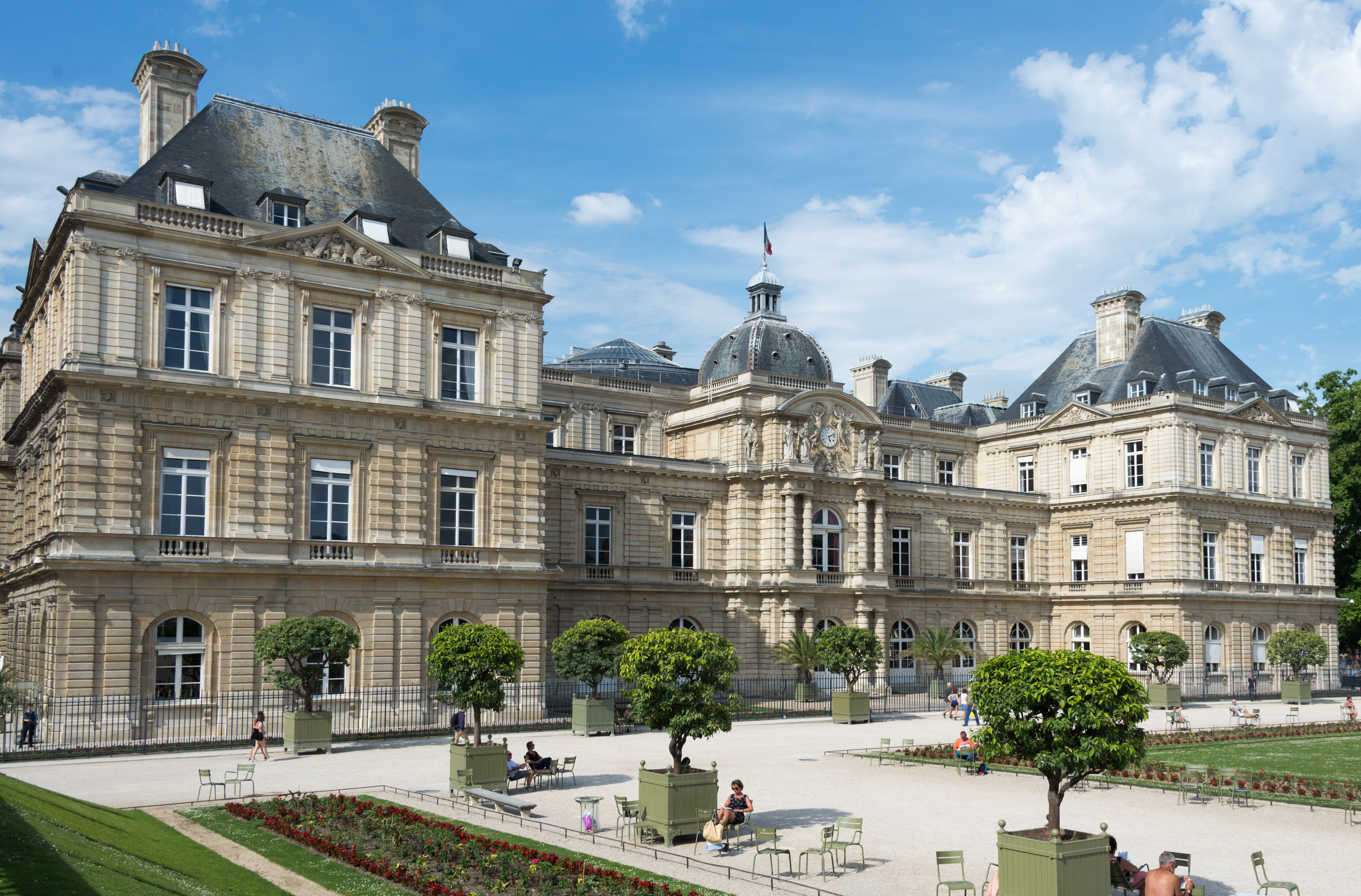
- Luxembourg Palace garden façade

General information
- Architectural style: Louis XIII
- Location: 6th arrondissement of Paris, France, 15 Rue de Vaugirard
- Current tenants: French Senate
- Construction started: 1615
- Completed: 1645; 381 years ago

Design and construction
- Architect: Salomon de Brosse
- Other designers: Jean-François Chalgrin; Alphonse de Gisors

The Luxembourg Palace (French: Palais du Luxembourg, pronounced [palɛ dy lyksɑ̃buʁ]) is at 15 Rue de Vaugirard in the 6th arrondissement of Paris, France. It was originally built (1615–1645) to the designs of the French architect Salomon de Brosse to be the royal residence of the regent Marie de' Medici, mother of King Louis XIII. After the Revolution it was refashioned (1799–1805) by Jean-François Chalgrin into a legislative building and subsequently greatly enlarged and remodeled (1835–1856) by Alphonse de Gisors. The palace has been the seat of the upper houses of the various French national legislatures (excepting only the unicameral National Assembly of the Second Republic) since the establishment of the Sénat conservateur during the Consulate; as such, it has been home to the Senate of the Fifth Republic since its establishment in 1958.

Immediately west of the palace on the Rue de Vaugirard is the Petit Luxembourg, now the residence of the Senate President; and slightly further west, the Musée du Luxembourg, in the former orangery. On the south side of the palace, the formal Luxembourg Garden presents a 25-hectare (62-acre) green parterre of gravel and lawn populated with statues and large basins of water where children sail model boats.

== History ==
=== Palace as royal residence ===
After the death of Henry IV in 1610, his widow, Marie de' Medici, became regent to her son, Louis XIII. Having acceded to a much more powerful position, she decided to erect a new palace for herself, adjacent to an old hôtel particulier owned by François de Luxembourg, Duc de Piney, which is now called the Petit Luxembourg and is the residence of the president of the French Senate.

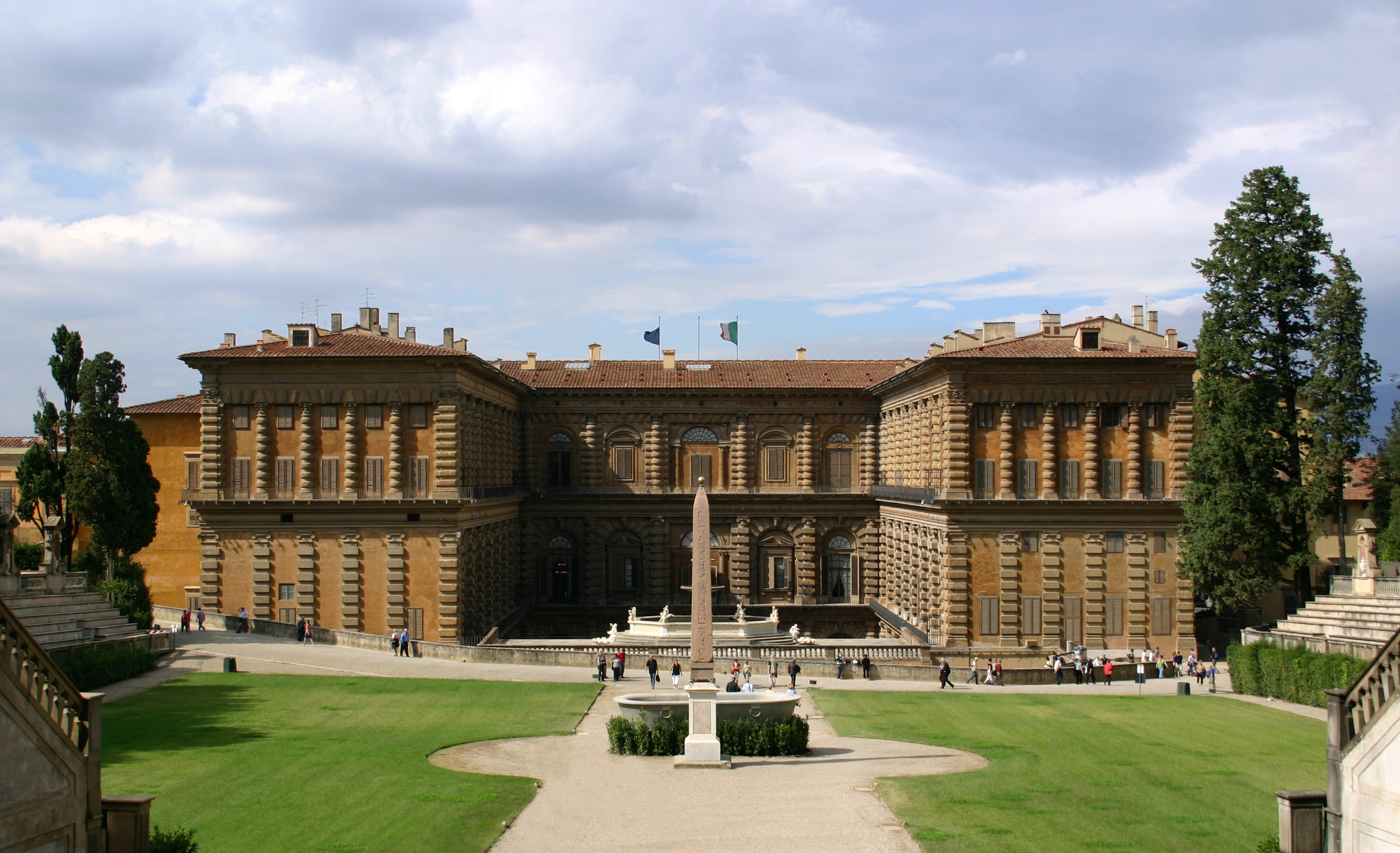
The Luxembourg Palace was modeled after the Palazzo Pitti in Florence at the request of Marie de' Medici.

Marie de' Medici desired to make a building similar to her native Florence's Palazzo Pitti; to this effect she had the architect Métezeau (either Louis Métezeau or his brother, Clément Métezeau) sent to Florence to make detailed drawings of the building.

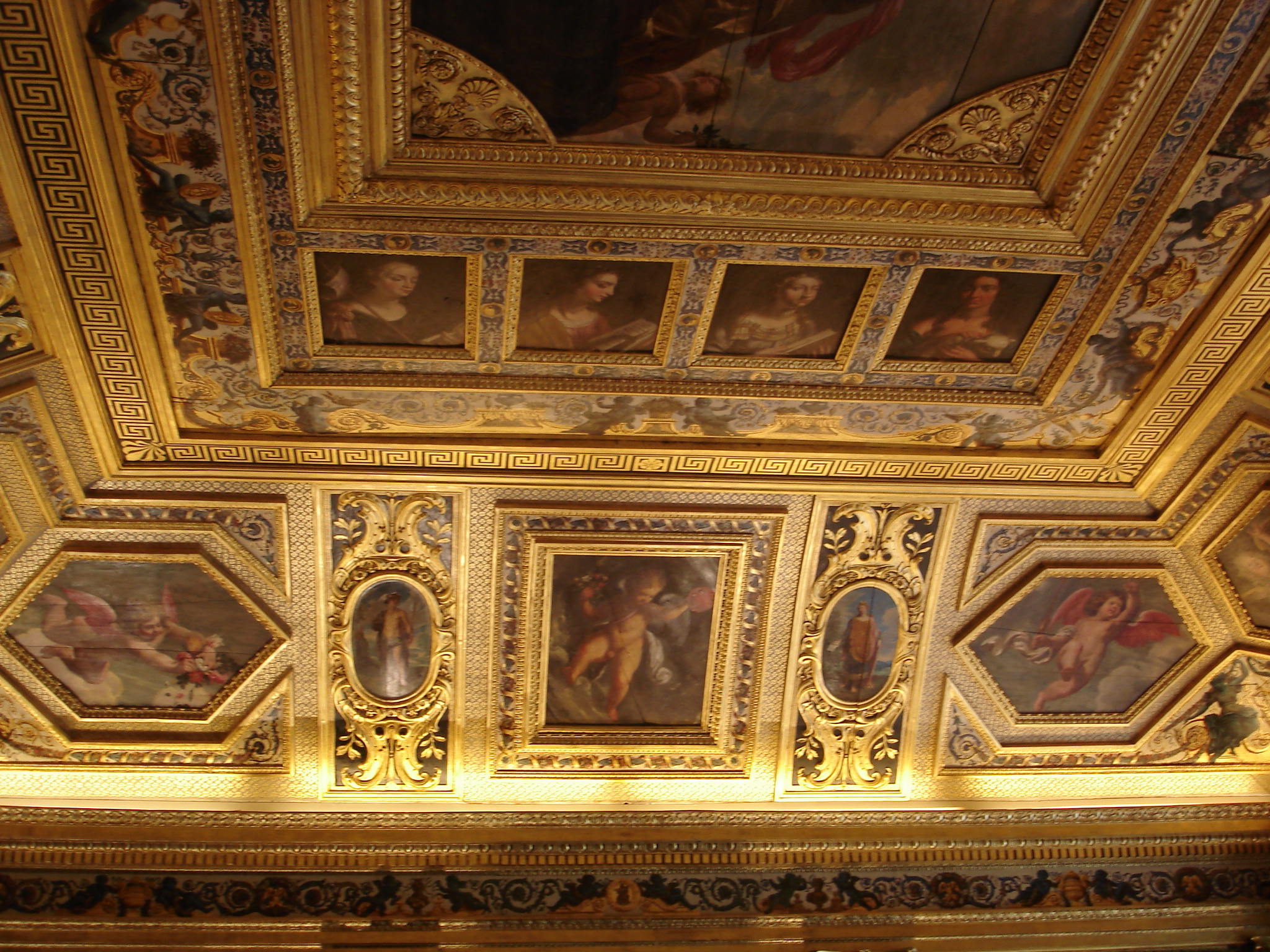
Ceiling of the Salle du Livre d'Or

She bought the Hôtel de Luxembourg and its fairly extensive domain in 1612 and commissioned the new building, which she referred to as her Palais Médicis, in 1615. Its construction and furnishing formed her major artistic project, though nothing remains today of the interiors as they were created for her, save some architectural fragments reassembled in the Salle du Livre d'Or. The suites of paintings she commissioned, in the subjects of which she expressed her requirements through her agents and advisers, are scattered among museums.

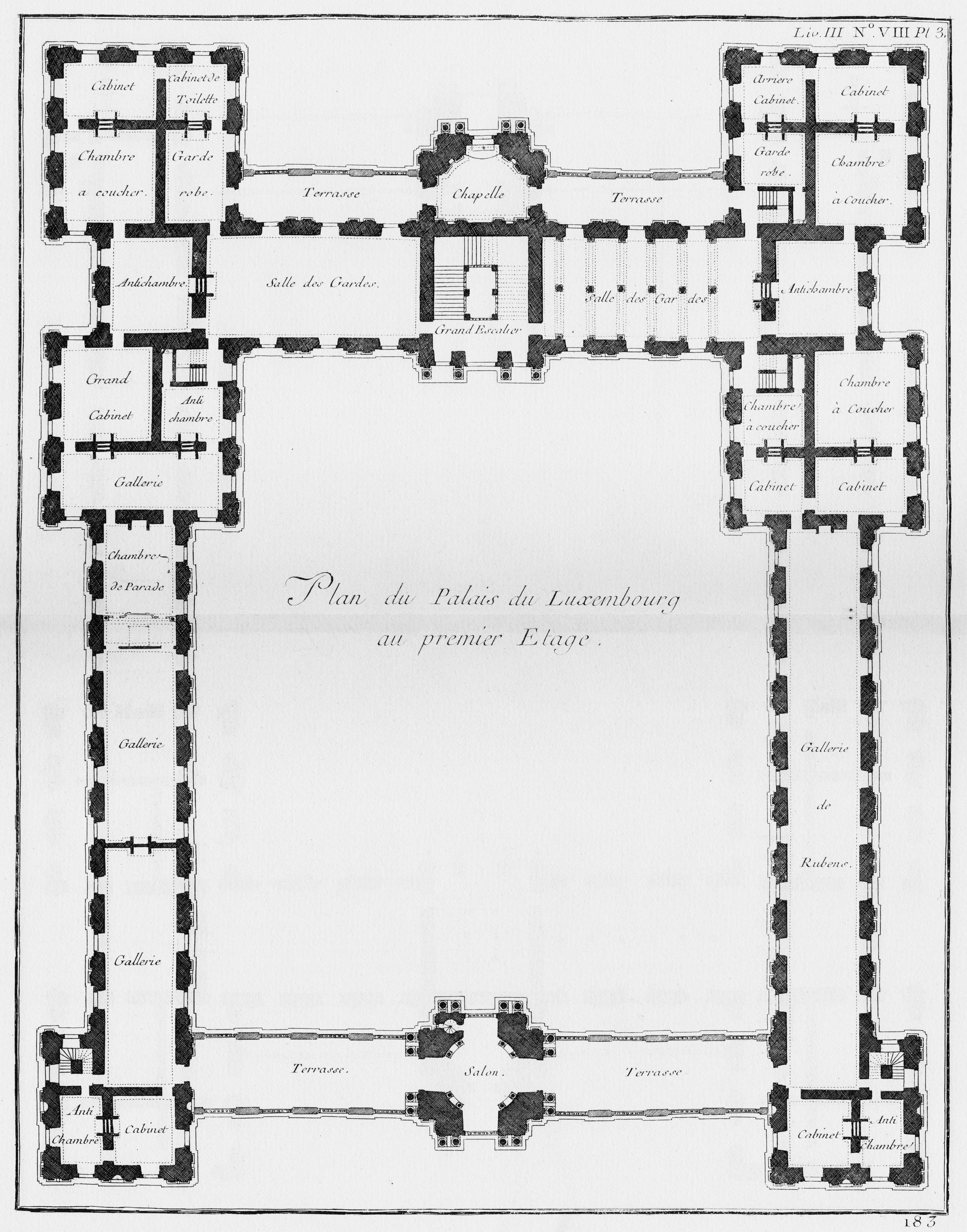
Floor plan (1752) shows the large enclosed cour d'honneur and the long Rubens gallery in the right wing

Marie installed her household in 1625, while work on interiors continued. The apartments in the right wing on the western side were reserved for the Queen and the matching suite to the east, for her son, Louis XIII, when he was visiting (floor plan). The 24 Marie de' Medici cycle canvases, a series commissioned from Peter Paul Rubens, were installed in the Galerie de Rubens on the main floor of the western wing. These paintings were executed between 1622 and 1625 and depicts Marie's struggles and triumphs in life. They are now visible in the Galerie Medicis of the Louvre, one of the treasures of the museum's Flemish paintings department. A series of paintings executed for her Cabinet doré ("gilded study") was identified by Anthony Blunt in 1967.

The gallery in the east wing had been intended for the display of paintings celebrating Henry IV and buildings housing stables and services were planned to either side of the pavilions flanking the entrance on the street, but these projects remained unfinished in 1631, when the Queen Mother was forced from court, following the "Day of the Dupes" in November. Louis XIII commissioned further decorations for the Palace from Nicolas Poussin and Philippe de Champaigne.

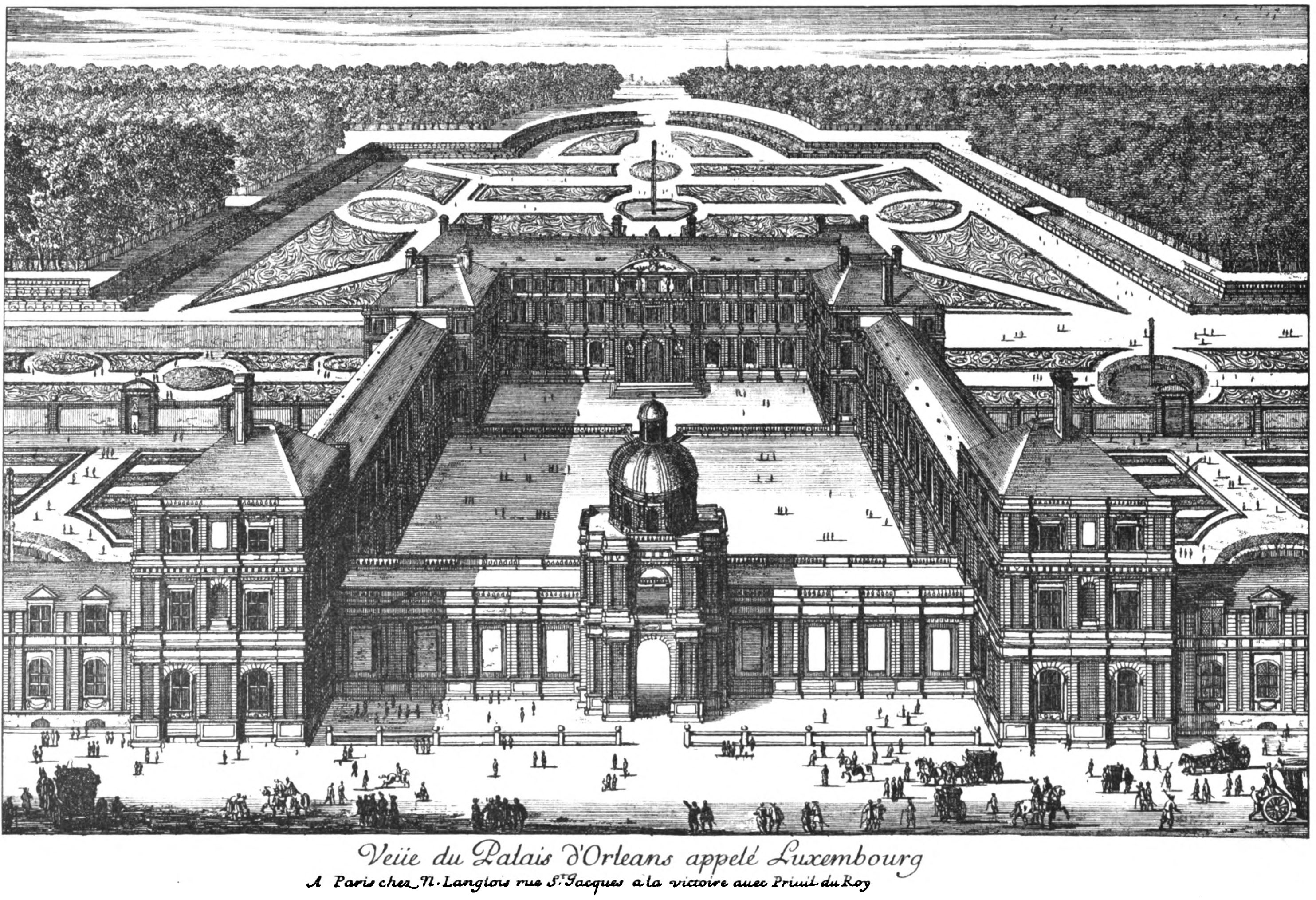
View of the Palais d'Orléans, c. 1643, with the garden parterre designed by Jacques Boyceau visible behind

In 1642, Marie de' Medici bequeathed the Luxembourg to her second and favourite son, Gaston, Duke of Orléans, who called it the Orléans Palace (Palais d'Orléans) but by popular will it was still known by its original name. Upon Gaston's death, the palace passed to his widow, Marguerite of Lorraine, then to his elder daughter by his first marriage, Anne, Duchess of Montpensier La Grande Mademoiselle. In 1660, Anne de Montpensier sold the Luxembourg to her younger half-sister, Élisabeth Marguerite of Orléans, duchess of Guise who, in turn, gave it to her cousin, King Louis XIV, in 1694.

In 1715, the Luxembourg Palace became the residence of Marie Louise Élisabeth d'Orléans, Duchess of Berry. The widowed Duchess was notorious for her promiscuity. At some of her more exclusive parties, Madame de Berry also played the leading part in elaborate "tableaux-vivants" that represented mythological scenes in which she played the part of Venus or Diana. According to various satirical songs, "the Lady of the Luxembourg" hid several pregnancies, shutting herself up from society when about to give birth. Her taste for strong liquors and her gluttony also scandalized the court. On 21 May 1717, Madame de Berry received Peter the Great at the Luxembourg. She welcomed the visiting Tsar dressed in a magnificent sack-back gown which helped conceal her swelling, for she was pregnant at the time. The Duchess of Berry was heavily pregnant at the time of Peter the Great's visit. She secretly gave birth a few weeks later in her castle at La Muette where she had secluded herself until the time of delivery. In spite of all efforts to conceal it, Madame de Berry's maternity was well known. It inspired the satirists who lampooned Berry's penchant for lovers writing up a long list of all possible fathers for her secret baby.

On 28 February 1718, the Duchess of Berry threw a party for her visiting aunt, Élisabeth Charlotte d'Orléans, duchess of Lorraine. The lavish banquet was followed by a masked ball. On 2 April 1719, after four days in labour, shut up in a small room of her palace, she delivered a still-born baby girl, supposedly fathered by her lieutenant of the guards, the Count of Riom. Berry's delivery was troublesome and almost killed her. The Church refused her the Sacraments. Saint-Simon wrote a sarcastic description of this childbirth. Hoping to regain her health and undeceive the public that she had been confined, Madame de Berry left Paris and the Luxembourg Palace. She died in her Château de la Muette on 21 July 1719 and, according to Saint-Simon, was found to be again pregnant.

In 1750, the palace became a museum, the forerunner of the Louvre, and was open two days a week until 1779. In 1778, the Luxembourg Palace was given to the Count of Provence by his brother Louis XVI. During the French Revolution, it was briefly a prison, then the seat of the French Directory, and in 1799, the home of the Sénat conservateur and the first residence of Napoleon Bonaparte, as First Consul of the French Republic.

=== Palace as legislature seat ===
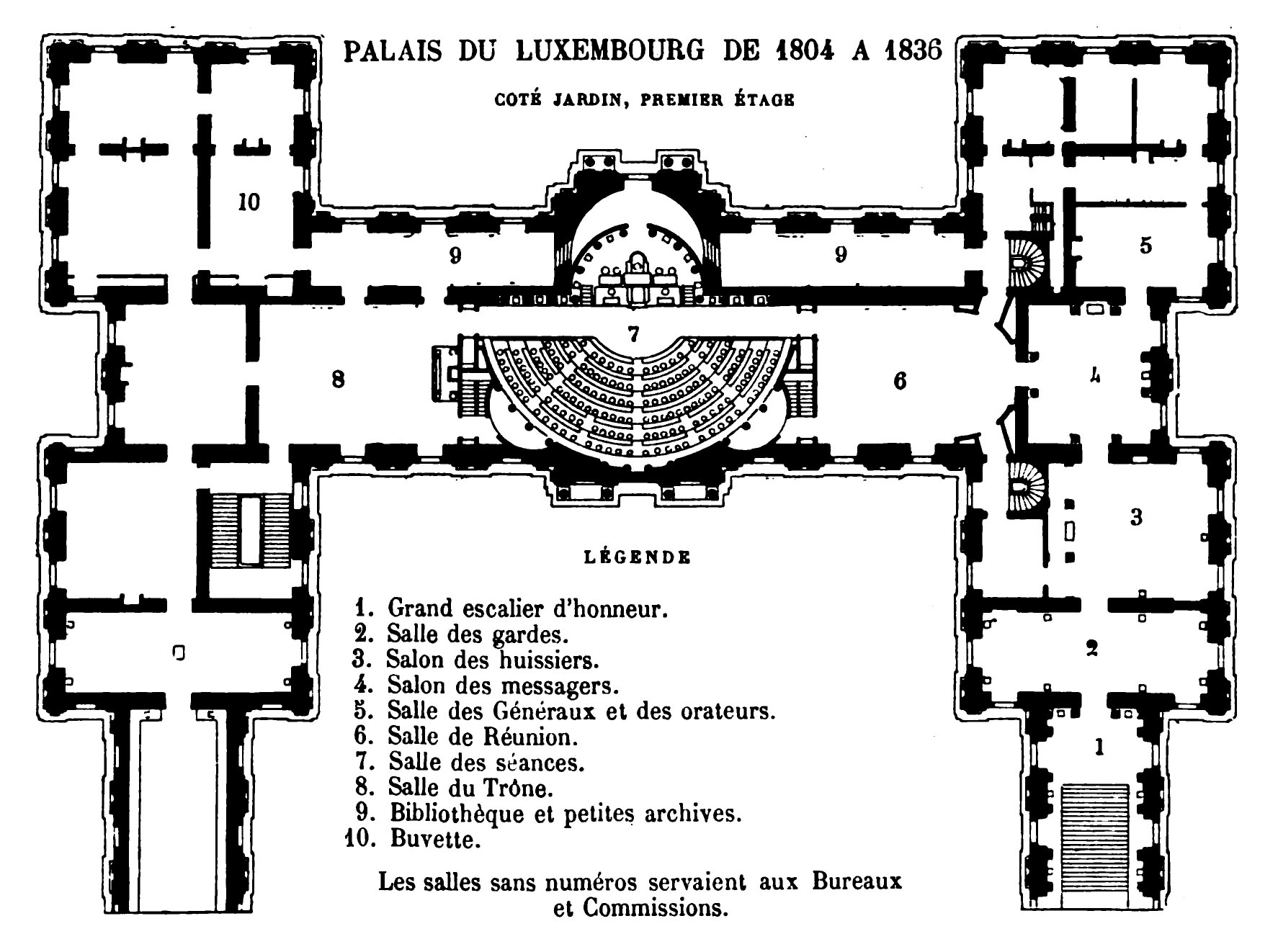
Plan of the corp de logis from 1804 to 1836 with the old Senate chamber

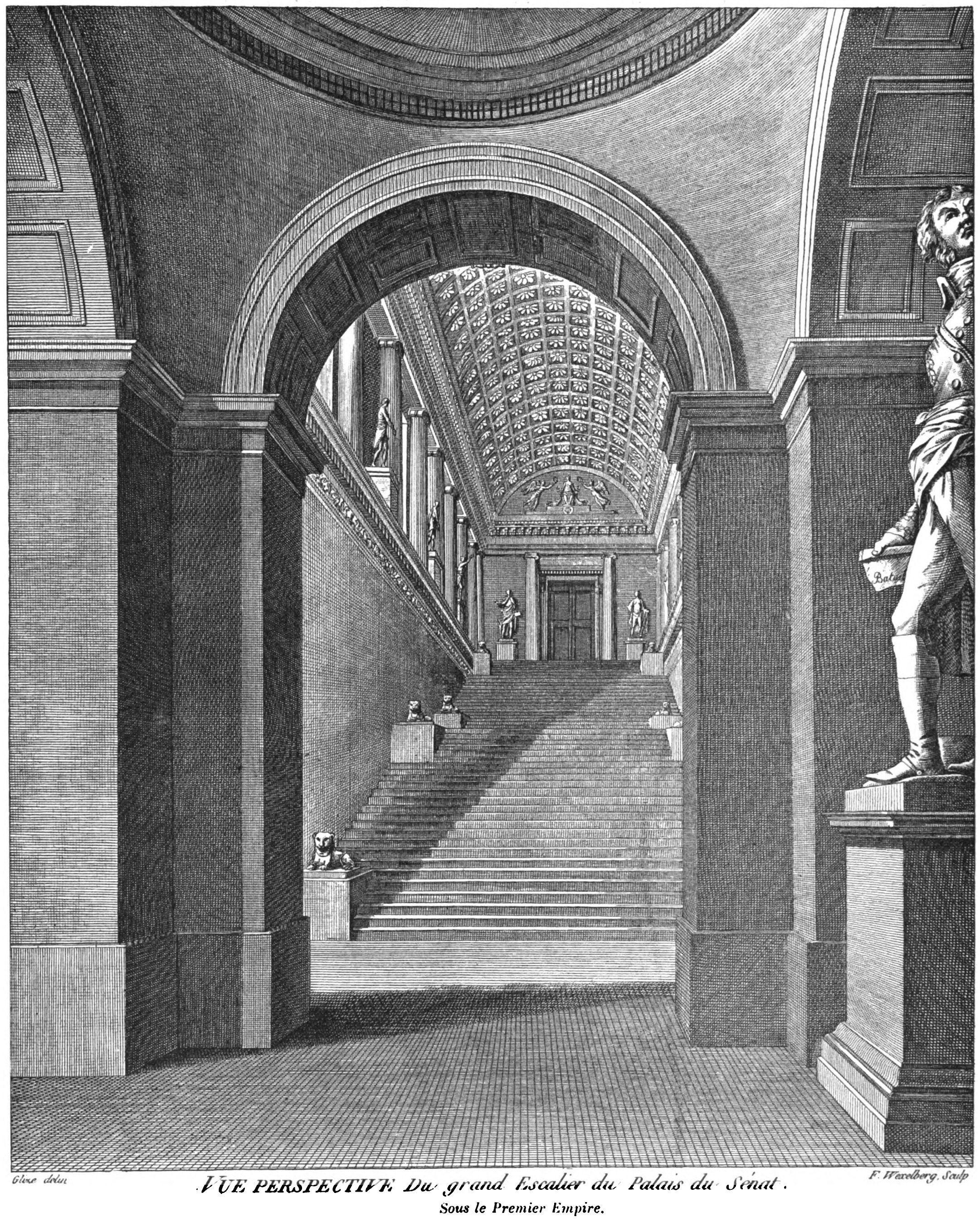
Chalgrin's grand staircase

From 1799 to 1805, the architect Jean-François Chalgrin transformed the palace into a legislative building. He demolished the grand central staircase (escalier d'honneur), replacing it with a senate chamber on the first floor, which incorporated and destroyed Marie de' Medici's chapel on the garden side of the corps de logis. Chalgrin also enclosed the flanking terraces, making space for a library. At the same time he created a neo-classical escalier d'honneur in the west wing, a single monumental flight enclosed by an Ionic colonnade and covered with a coffered barrel vault, the construction of which resulted in the destruction of the long gallery that had formerly housed the cycle of paintings by Rubens.

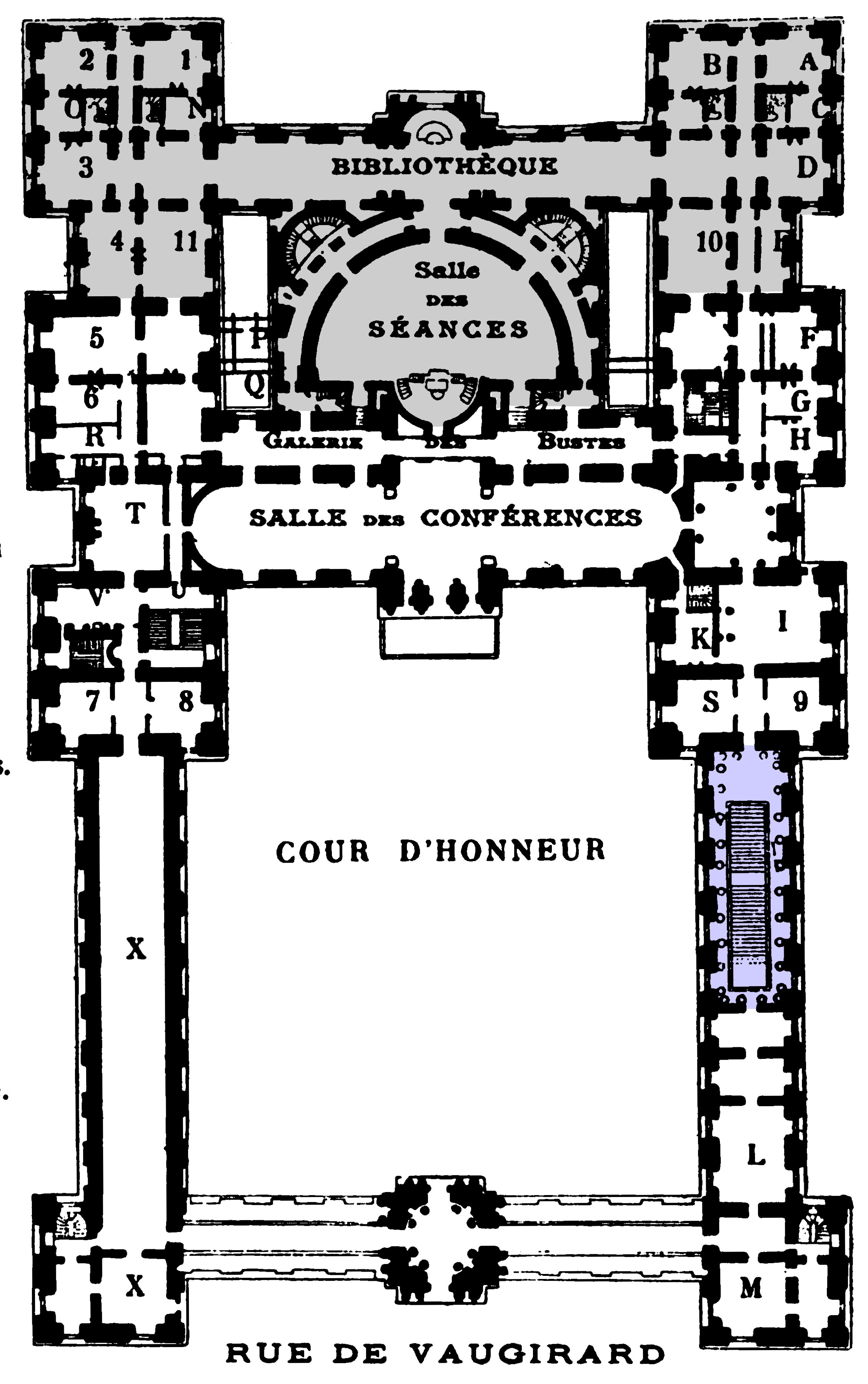
Plan showing Gisors's garden wing and Senate chamber (gray) and Chalgrin's grand staircase (blue)

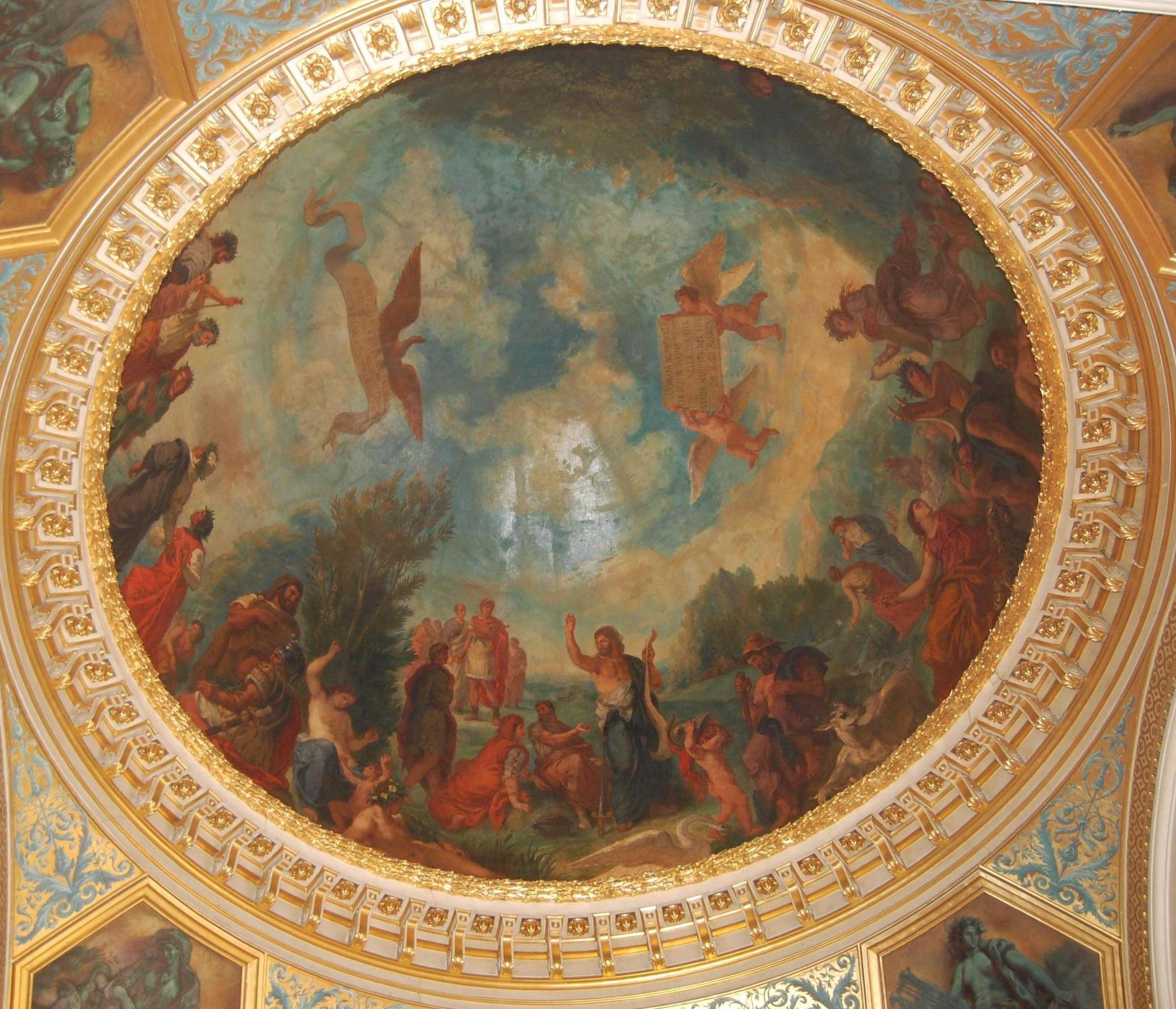
Library ceiling with Dante's Inferno by Delacroix

Beginning in 1835, the architect Alphonse de Gisors added a new garden wing parallel to the old corps de logis, replicating the look of the original 17th-century façade so precisely that it is difficult to distinguish at first glance the old from the new. The new senate chamber was located in what would have been the courtyard area in between.

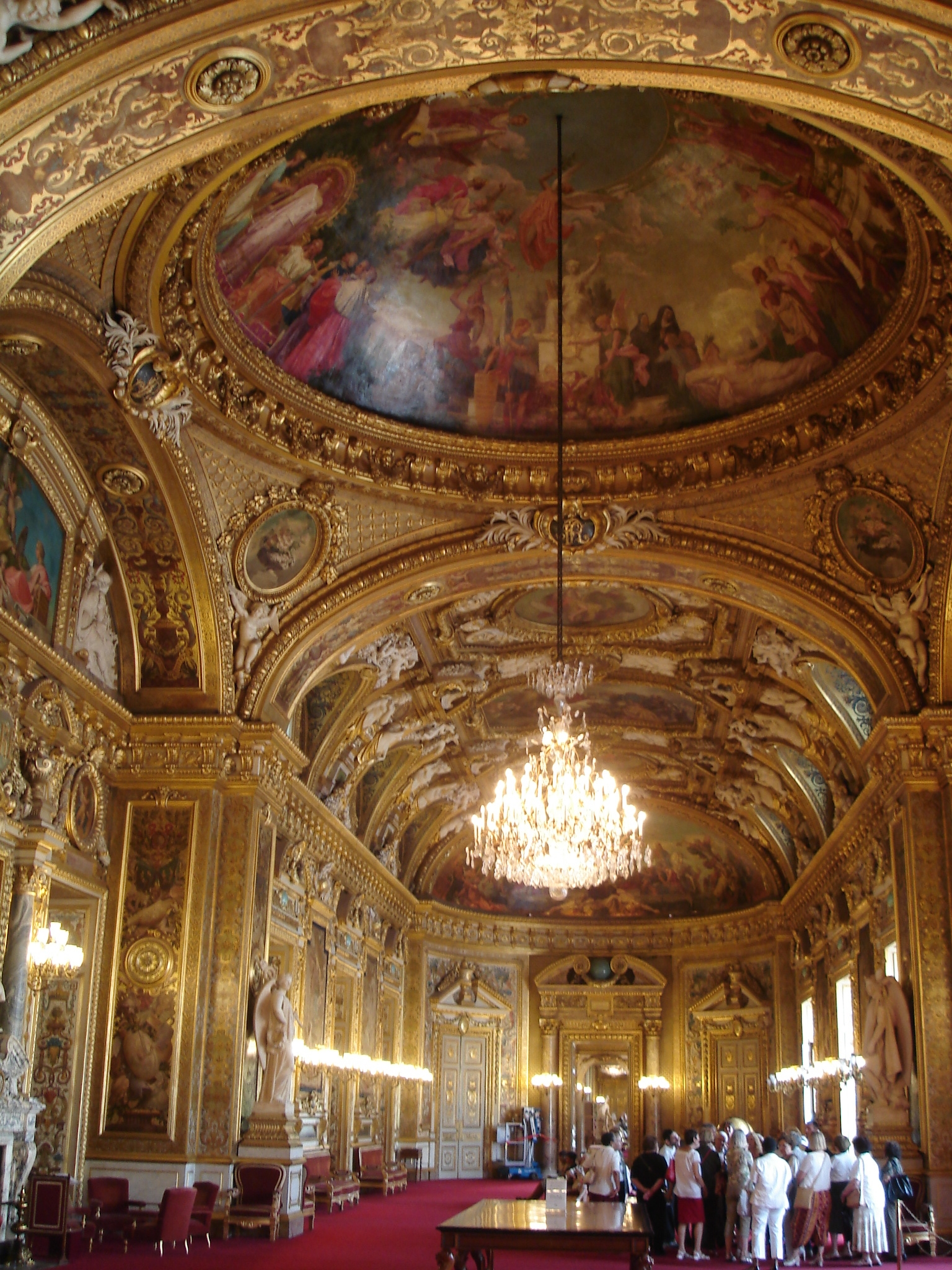
Salle des Conférences

The new wing included a library (bibliothèque) with a cycle of paintings (1845–1847) by Eugène Delacroix. In the 1850s, at the request of Emperor Napoleon III, Gisors created the highly-decorated Salle des Conférences (inspired by the Galerie d'Apollon of the Louvre), which influenced the nature of subsequent official interiors of the Second Empire, including those of the Palais Garnier.

During the German occupation of France (1940–44), Hermann Göring took over the palace as the headquarters of the Luftwaffe in France and took for himself a sumptuous suite of rooms to accommodate his visits to the French capital. His subordinate, Luftwaffe Field Marshal Hugo Sperrle, was also given an apartment in the Luxembourg Palace. He spent most of the war by enjoying the luxurious surroundings. "The Field Marshal's craving for luxury and public display ran a close second to that of his superior, Goering; he was also his match in corpulence", wrote Armaments Minister Albert Speer after a visit to Sperrle in Paris.

The palace was a designated "strong point" for German forces defending the city in August 1944, but thanks to the decision of Commanding General Dietrich von Choltitz to surrender the city rather than fight, the palace was only minimally damaged although furniture was stolen. On 7 November 1944, after the Liberation of France, the Provisional Consultative Assembly held its first meeting at the Luxembourg Palace.

From 29 July to 15 October 1946, the Luxembourg Palace was the site of the talks of the Paris Peace Conference.

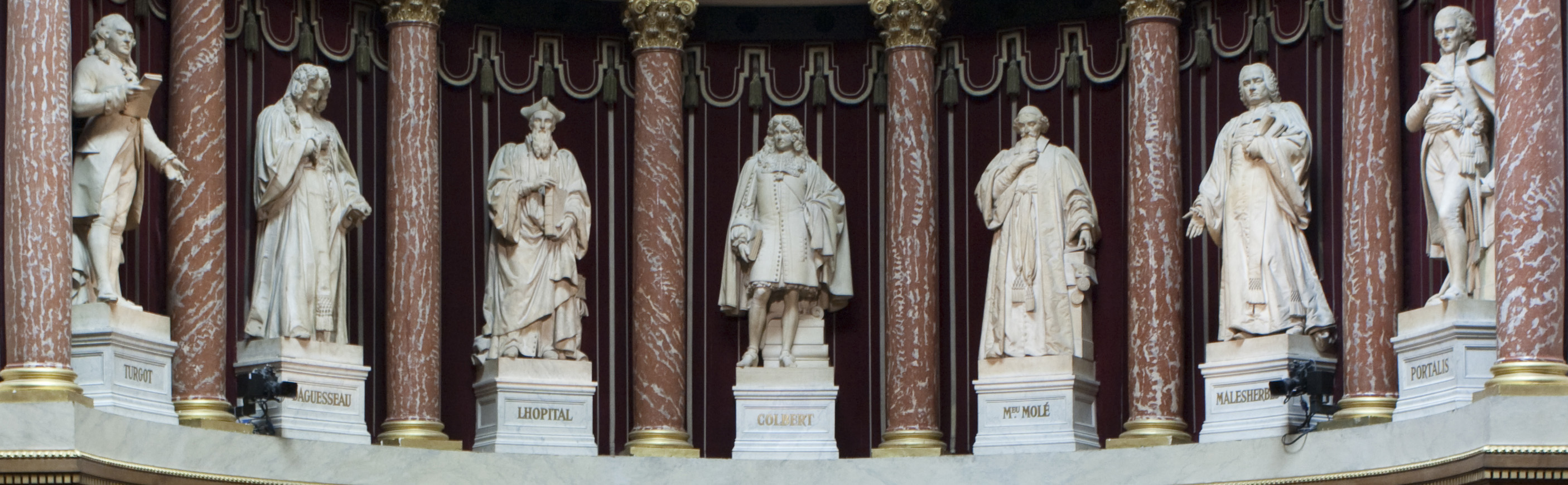
The Seven Statues facing the Senate Chamber's Semicircle (from left to right): Turgot • d'Aguesseau • l'Hôpital • Colbert • Molé • Malesherbes • Portalis

== Gallery ==
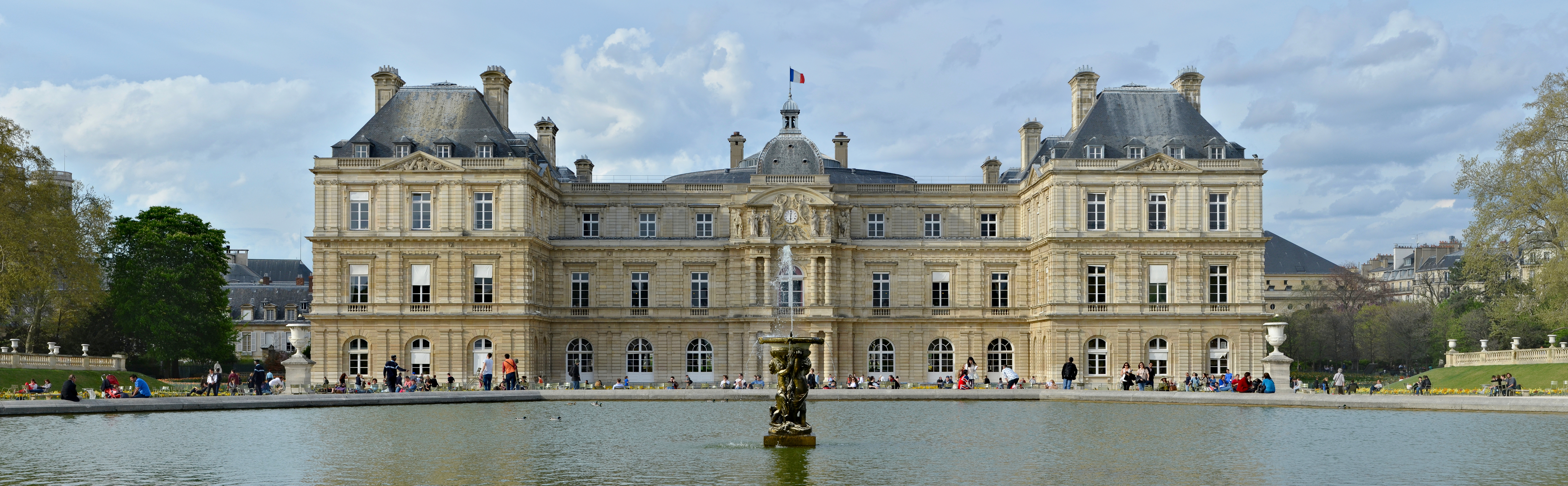
View of the south façade and the garden basin

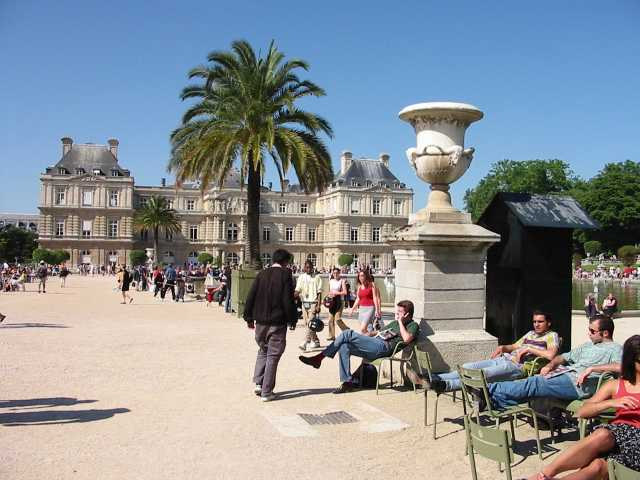
View from the Luxembourg Gardens

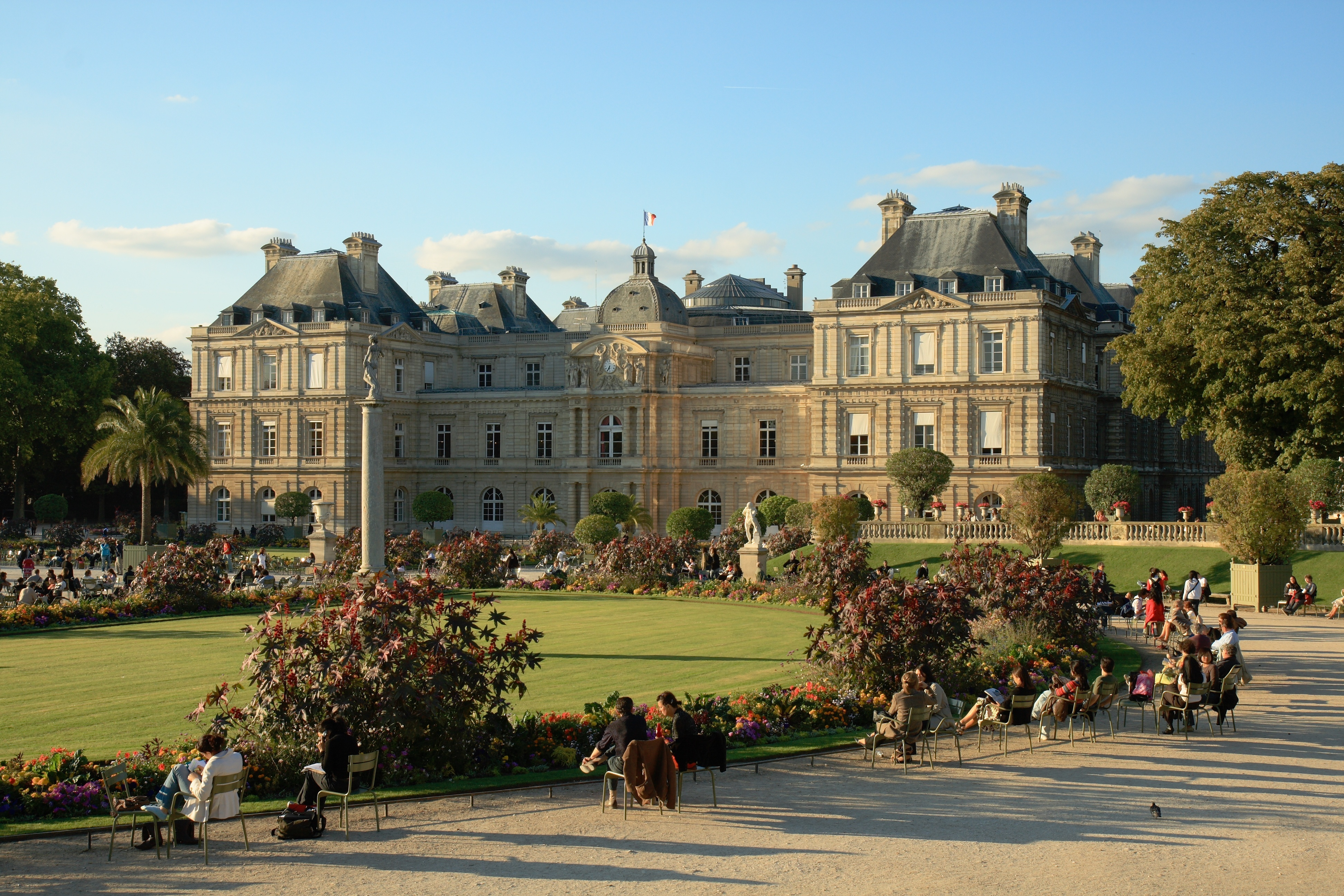
At sunset

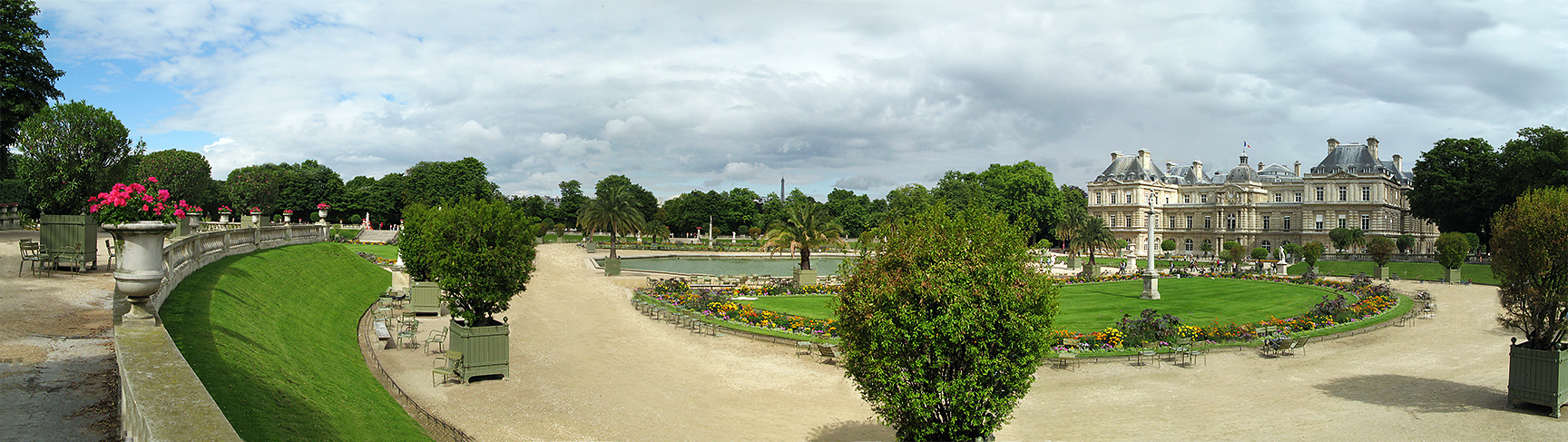
Panorama of the palace and its gardens

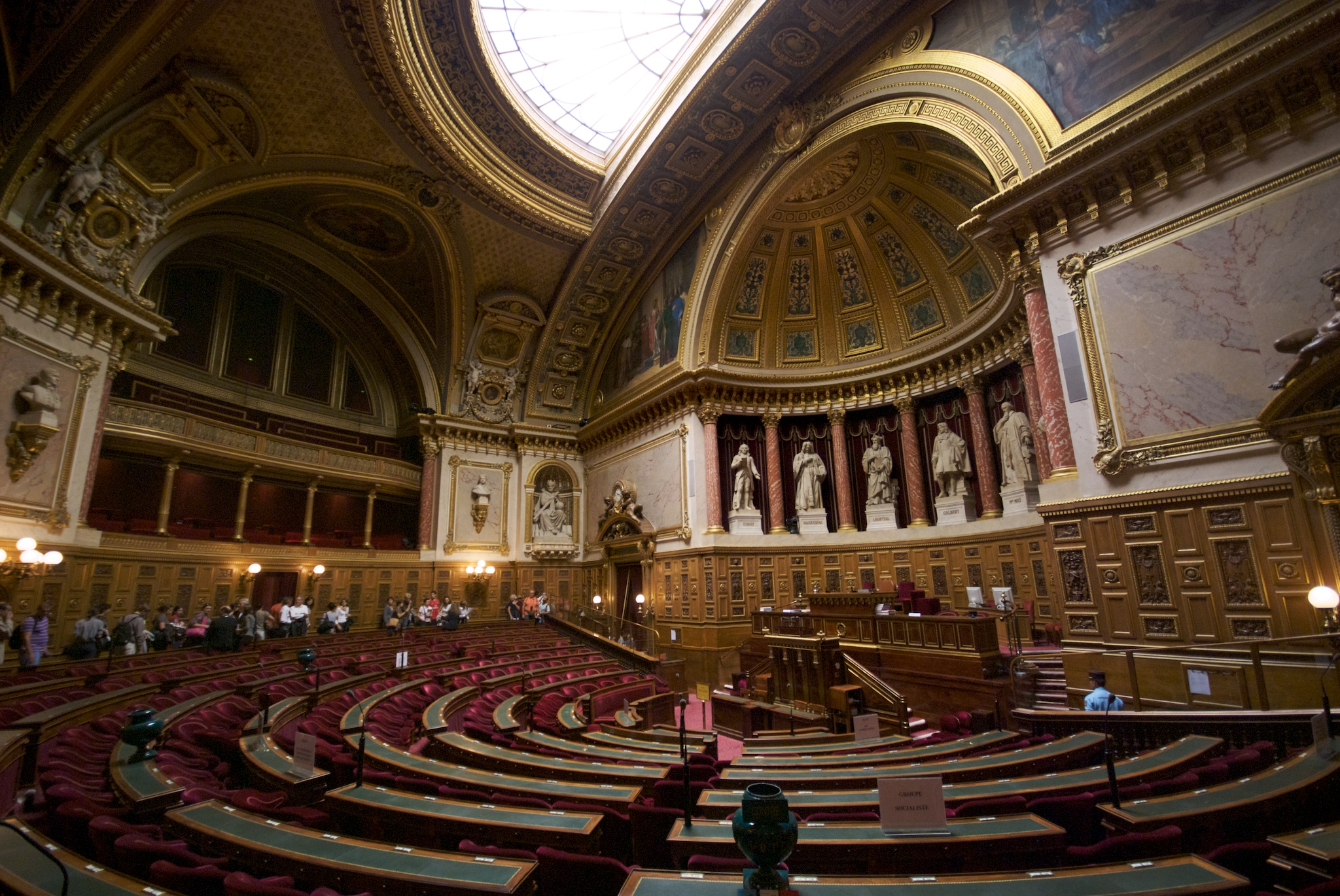
Senate chamber

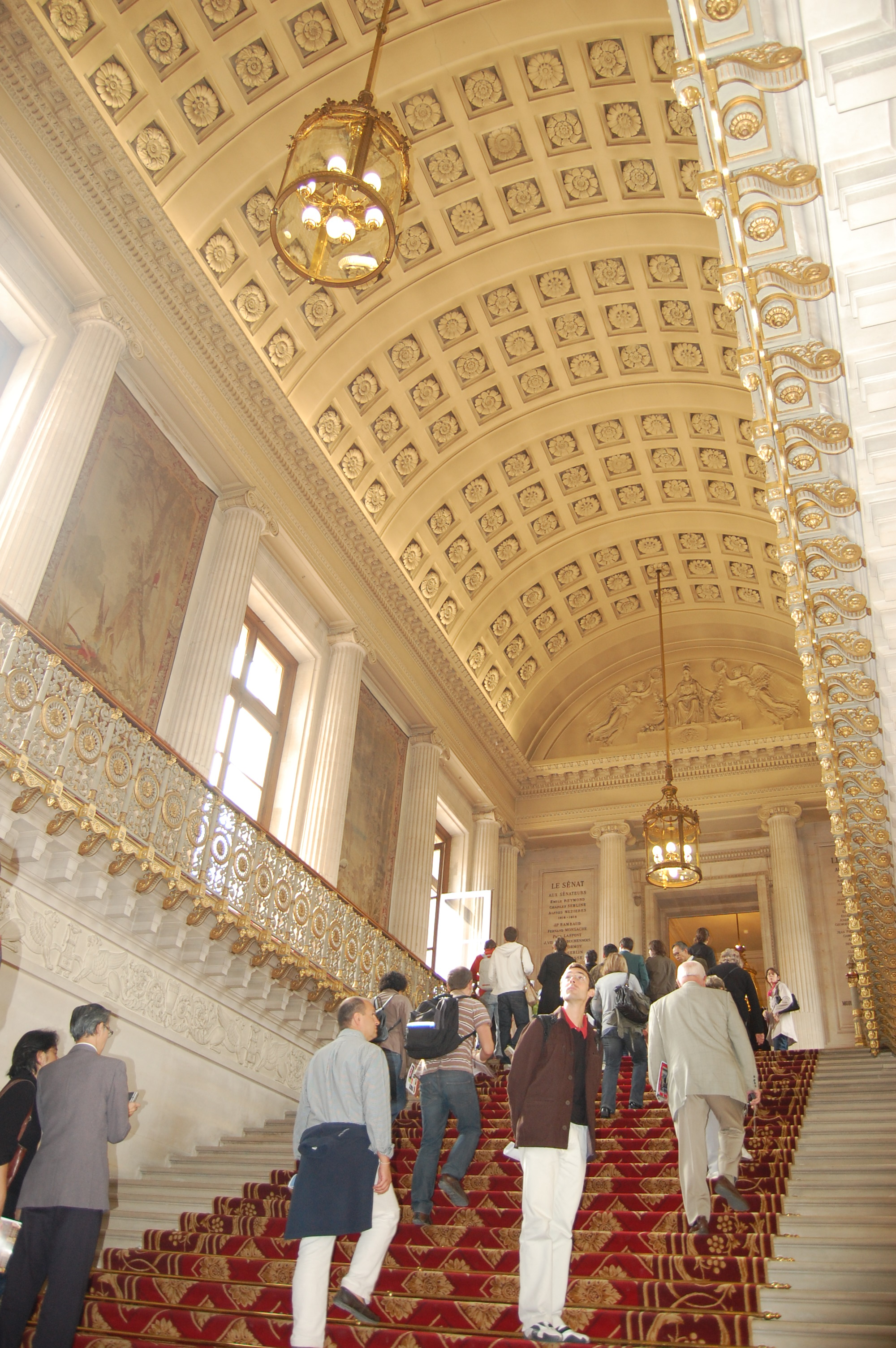
Grand staircase

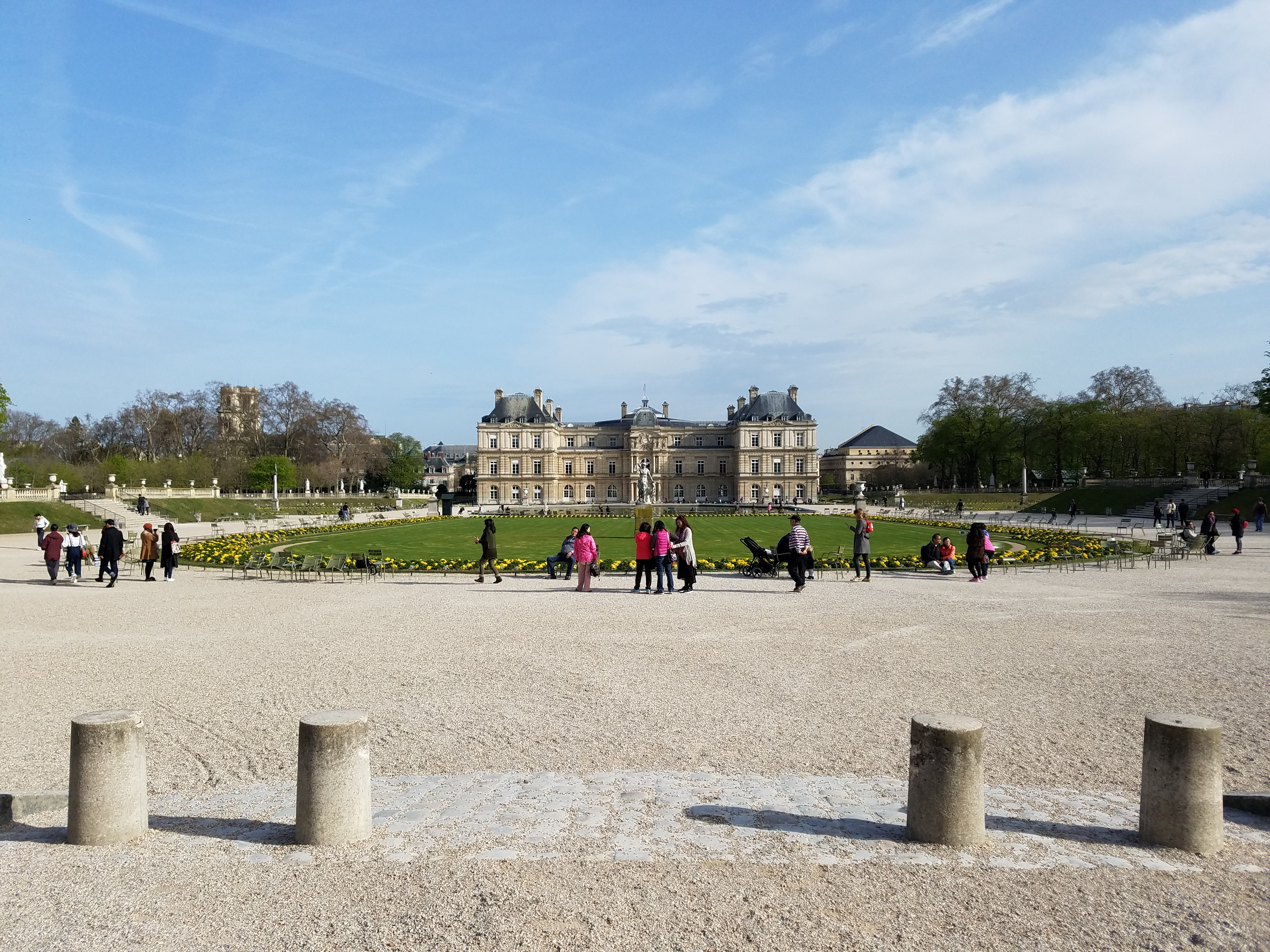
View from the south

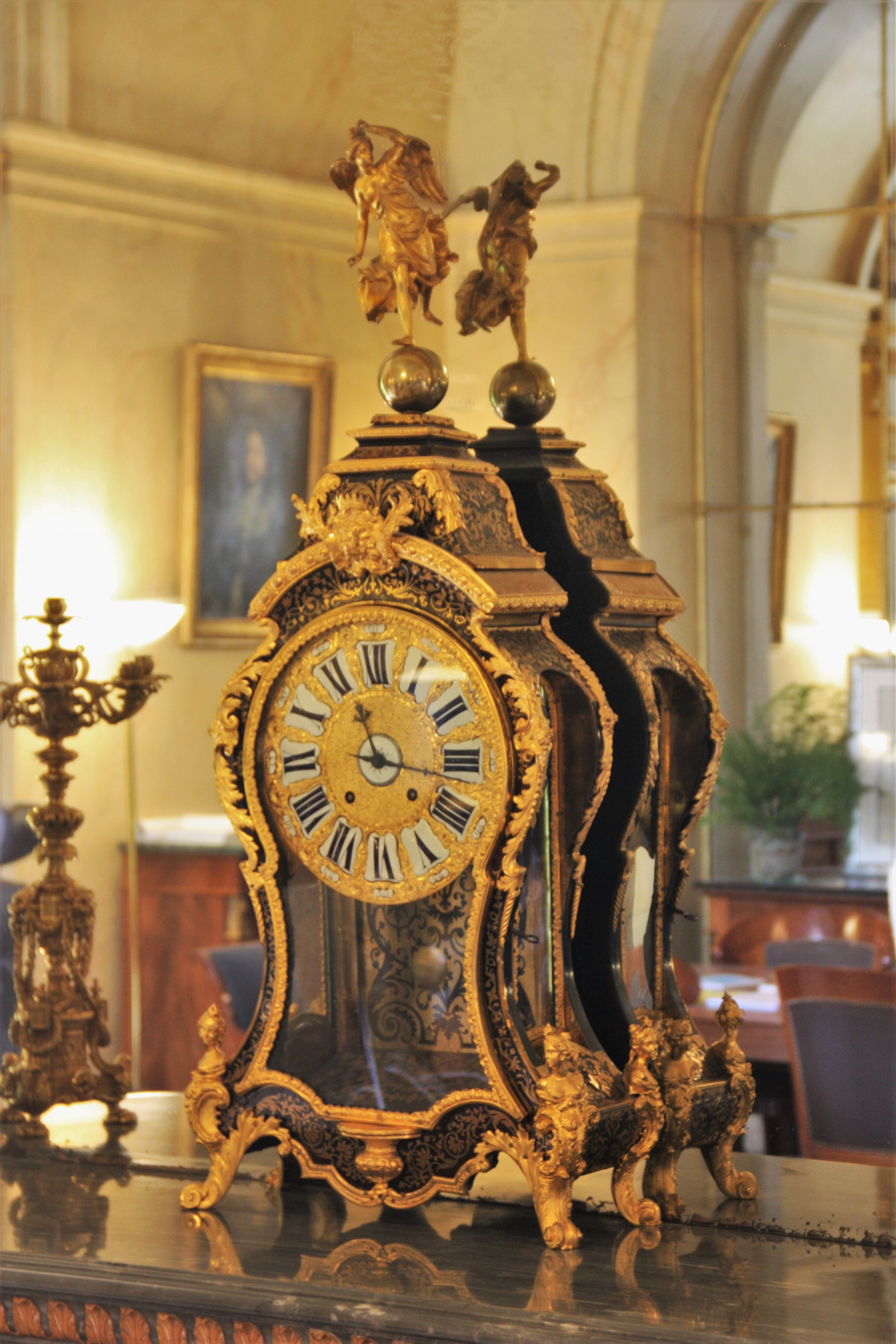
Clock

== See also ==
- List of works by James Pradier
- Orangerie du Sénat
- Musée du Luxembourg
