= Seyidlər, Khachmaz =

Seyidlər
- Municipality
- Location within Azerbaijan
- Coordinates: 41°36′N 48°39′E
- Country: Azerbaijan
- Rayon: Khachmaz

Population
  - Total: 378
- Time zone: UTC+4 (AZT)
  - Summer (DST): UTC+5 (AZT)

Seyidlər (also, Seidlyar and Seydlyar) is a village and municipality in the Khachmaz Rayon of Azerbaijan. It has a population of 378.
