= Salomon de Brosse =

French architect (c. 1571–1626)

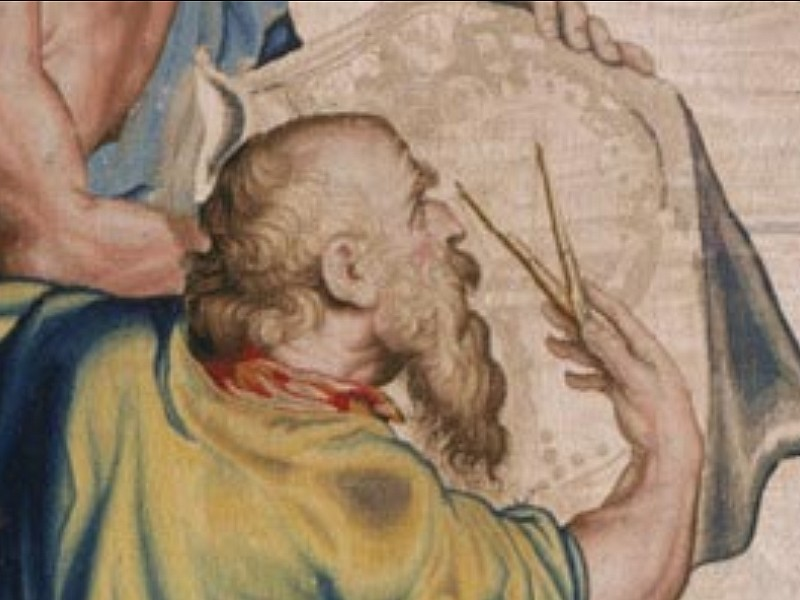
- Presumed portrait of Salomon de Brosse by Peter Paul Rubens (1622)
- Born: c. 1571; Verneuil-sur-Oise, France
- Died: 8 December 1626 (aged 54–55); Paris, France
- Occupation: Architect
- Buildings: Luxembourg Palace; Façade of Saint-Gervais; Parlement de Bretagne

Salomon de Brosse (French: [salɔmɔ̃ də bʁɔs]; c. 1571 – 8 December 1626) was an early 17th-century French architect who moved away from late Mannerism to reassert the French classical style and was a major influence on François Mansart.

== Life ==
Salomon was born in Verneuil-en-Halatte, Oise, into a prominent Huguenot family, the grandson through his mother of the designer Jacques I Androuet du Cerceau and the son of the architect Jean de Brosse. He was established in practice in Paris in 1598 and was promoted to court architect in 1608.

De Brosse died, aged 55, in Paris.

== Luxembourg Palace ==
De Brosse greatly influenced the sober and classicizing direction that French Baroque architecture was to take, especially in designing his most prominent commission, the Luxembourg Palace, Paris (1615-1624), for Marie de' Medici, whose patronage had been extended to his uncle. Salomon de Brosse simplified the crowded compositions of his Androuet du Cerceau heritage and contemporary practice, ranging the U-shaped block round an entrance court, as Carlo Maderno was doing at Palazzo Barberini, Rome, about the same time. The impetus for the plan is often traced to Palazzo Pitti, Florence, where the Medici queen had spent her youth, but the formal plan of Anet could also be adduced. He clad the building wholly in stone, avoiding the lively contrast of brick and stone that was the more familiar idiom. Though de Brosse was forced to relinquish his post on 24 March 1624, construction of the Luxembourg proceeded according to his plan and elevations; extensions made in the nineteenth century have not obscured his external elements.

Luxembourg Palace

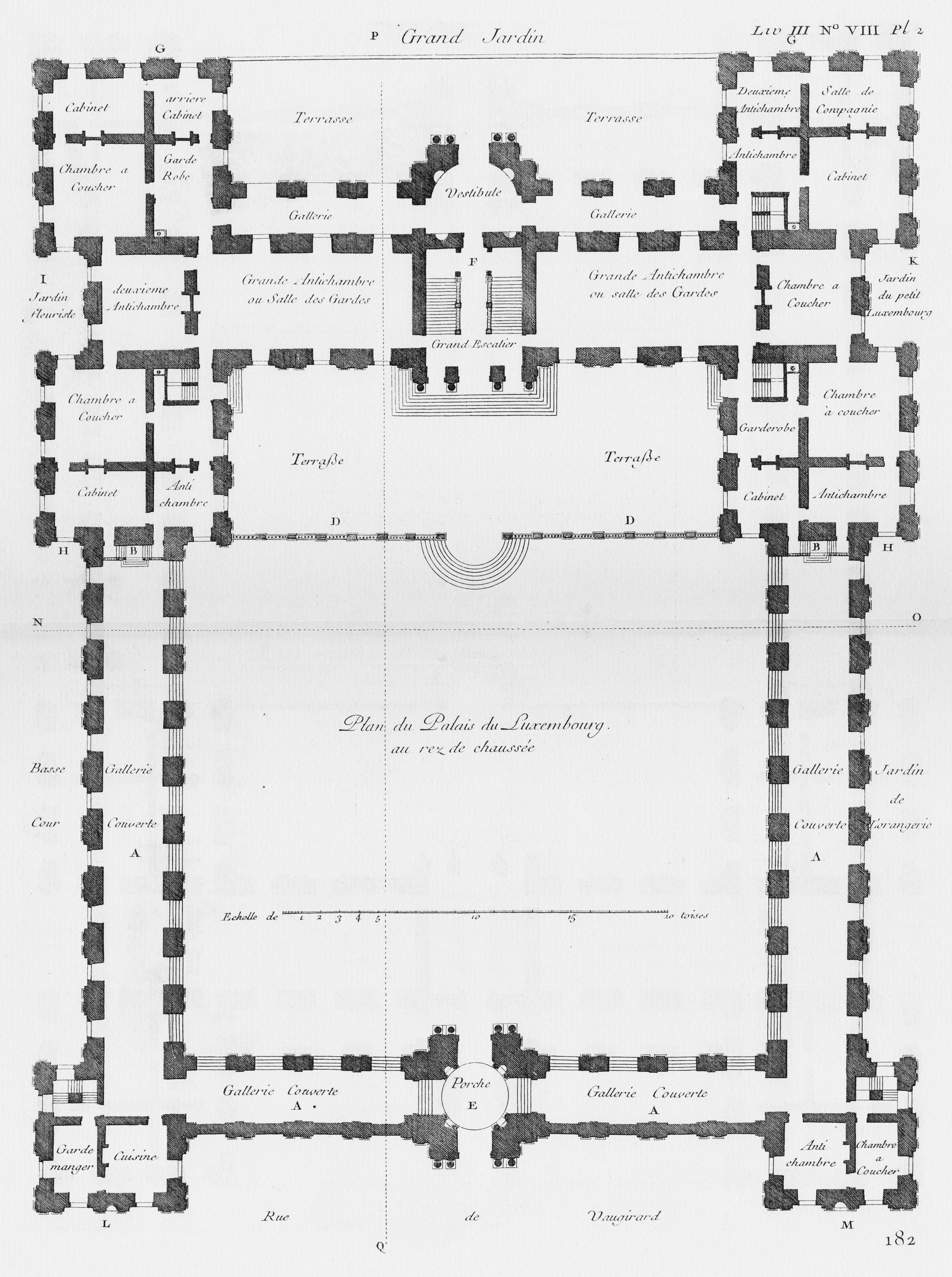
Plan of the ground floor

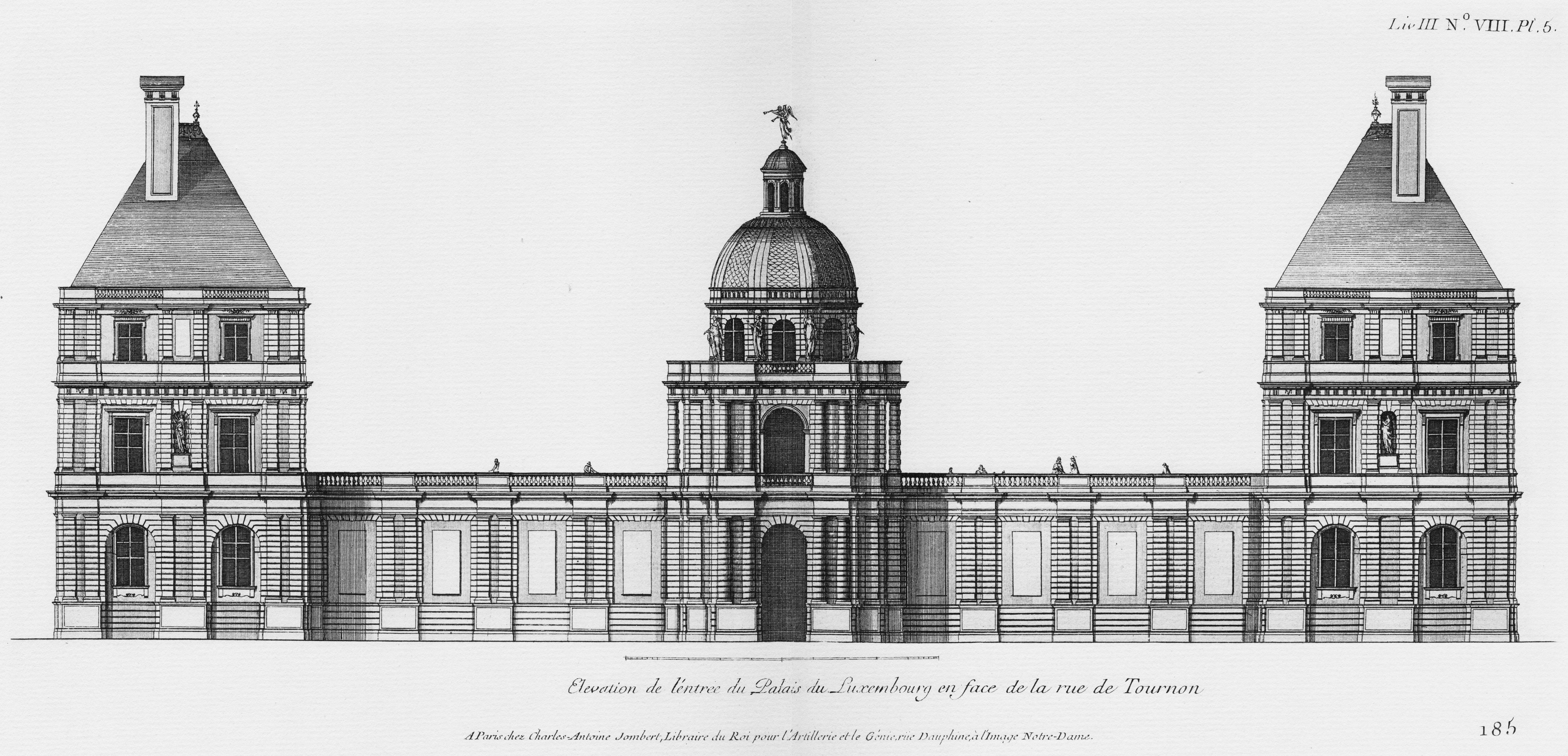
Elevation of the street façade

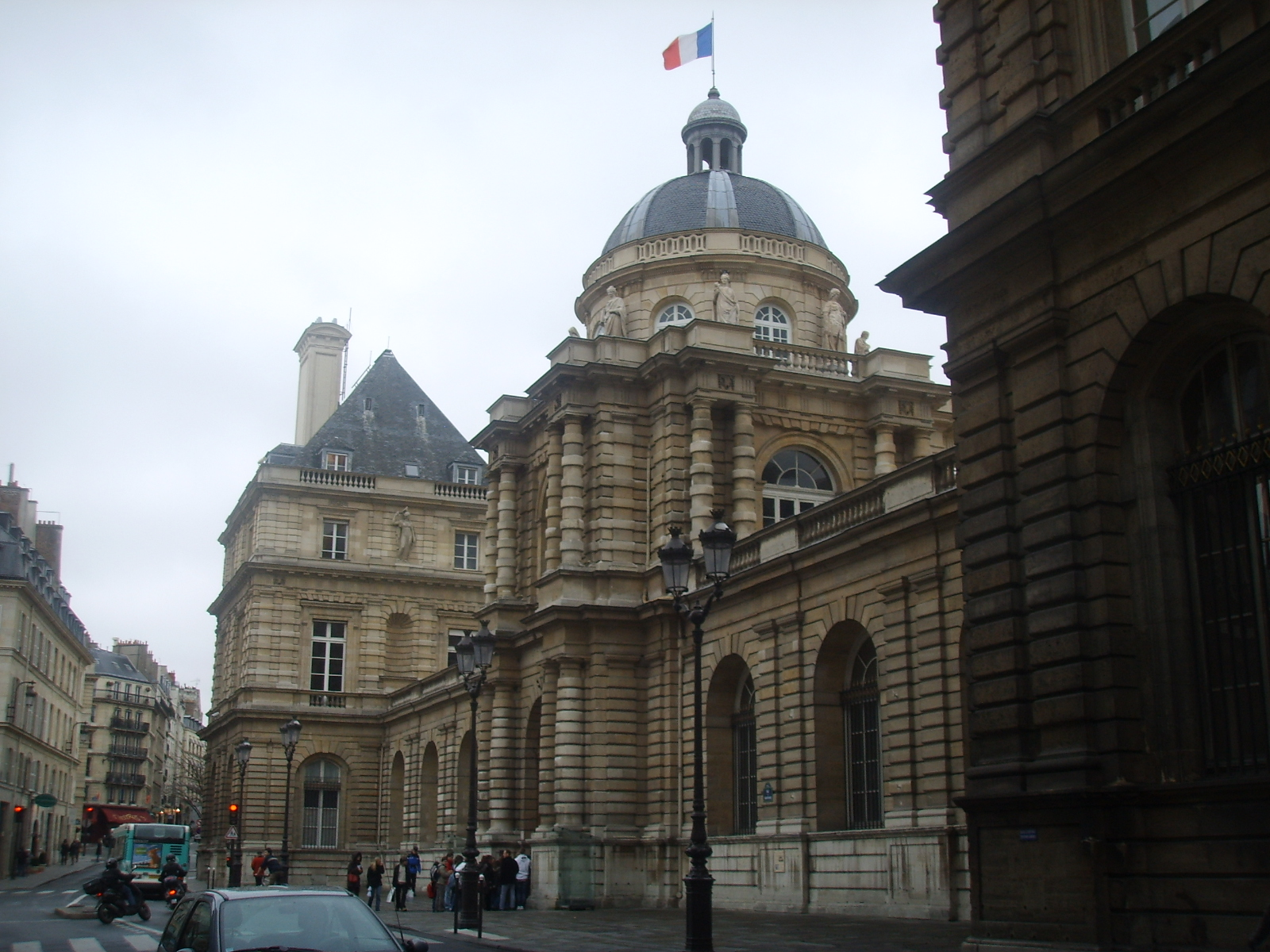
Street façade in 2007

== List of works ==
- Completion (1608 – c. 1615) of the Château de Montceaux-en-Brie
- Château of Coulommiers-en-Brie (1612–15), for Catherine Gonzaga, duchesse de Longueville.
- Facade of the Church of Saint-Gervais, Paris (1615–1621)
- Luxembourg Palace, Paris (1615–1624)
- Parlement de Bretagne, Rennes (1618) (now Palace of Justice (Rennes))
- Aqueduct of Arcueil (1624)
- Designs (1611/1612) for the Château of Blérancourt (completed c. 1619)

== Gallery ==
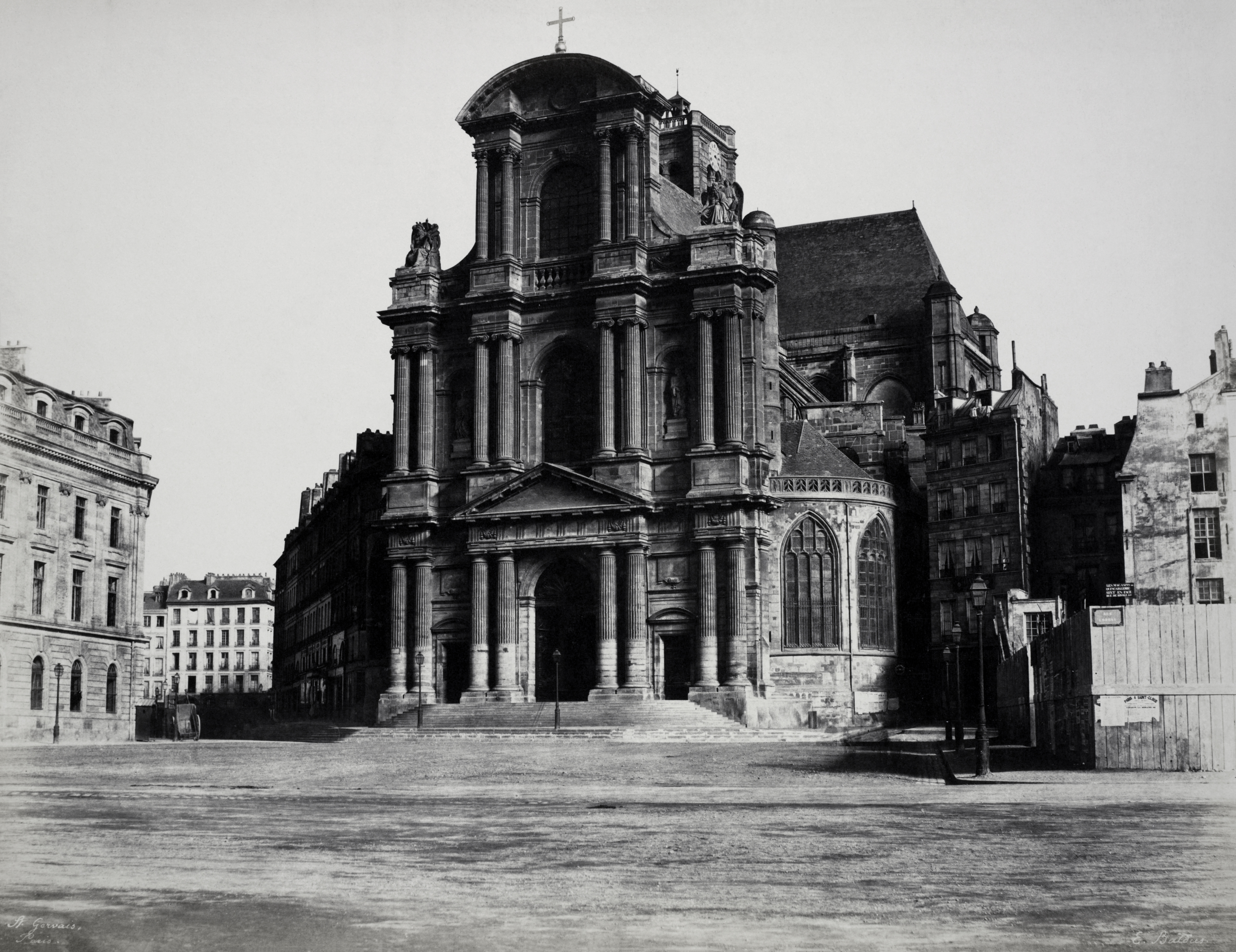
Façade of Saint-Gervais, photo (c. 1855) by Édouard Baldus

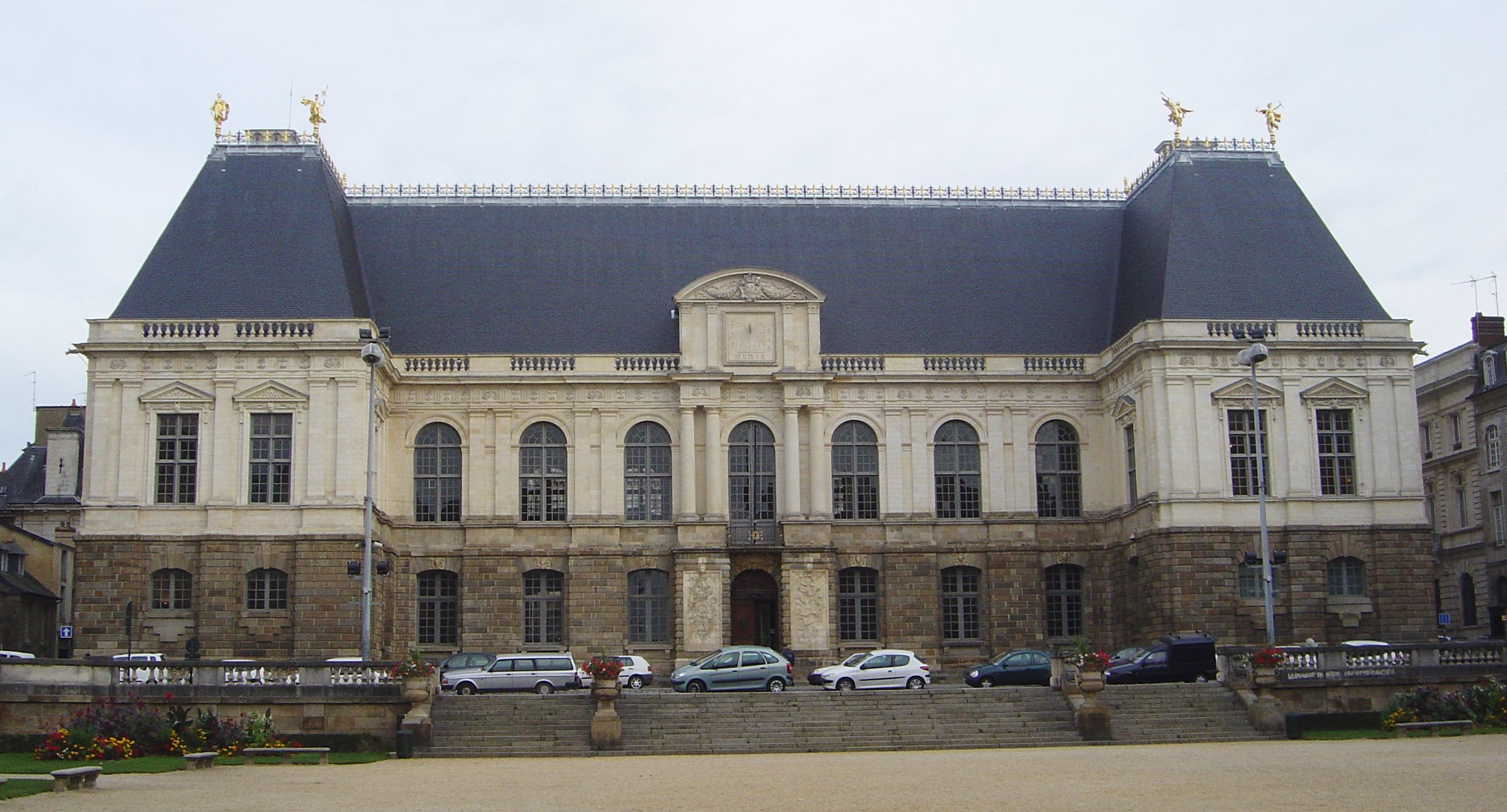
The Parlement de Bretagne, Rennes (1618)

== Bibliography ==
- Ayers, Andrew (2004). The Architecture of Paris. Stuttgart; London: Edition Axel Menges. ISBN 9783930698967.
- Blondel, Jacques-François (1752). Architecture françoise, reimpression of 1904, vol. 2. Paris: Librairie centrale des Beaux-Arts.
- Coope, Rosalys (1972). Salomon de Brosse and the Development of the Classical Style in French Architecture from 1565 to 1630. London: A. Zwemmer. OCLC 462335463. University Park: The Pennsylvania State University Press. OCLC 533450
- Coope, Rosalys (1996). "Brosse, Solomon de" in The Dictionary of Art, edited by Jane Turner, reprinted with minor corrections in 1998, vol. 4, pp. 864–866. London: Macmillan. ISBN 9781884446009.
