= Jean Métezeau =

French architect (died 1600)

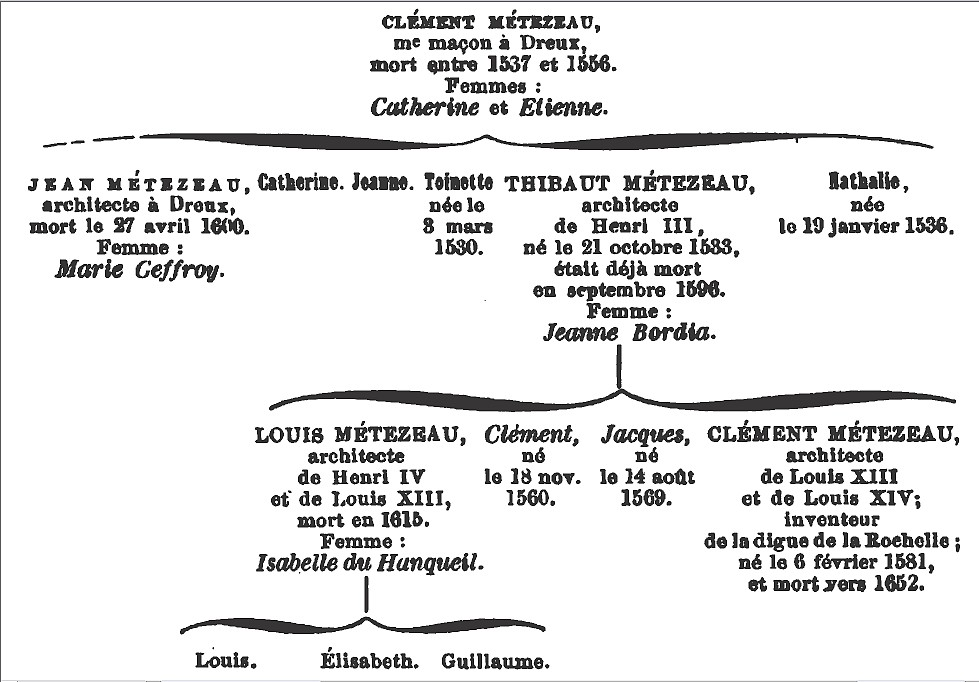
Family tree of the "Métezeau"

Jean Métezeau ( ? – 27 April 1600 in Dreux) was a 16th-century French architect. He came from a family of master masons and general contractors from Dreux. He was the son of Clément Métezeau and brother of Thibault Métezeau, also architects.

A disciple of Philibert de l'Orme, Métezeau worked at Dreux as a master builder at the Église Saint-Pierre de Dreux, where he reinterpreted gothic architecture in the spirit of what De l'Orme made at the Sainte-Chapelle de Vincennes. After completing the Saint-Vincent tower, he probably built the south arm of the transept and its portal.

== Bibliography ==
- Babelon, Jean-Pierre (1996). Métezeau family, vol. 21, pp. 545–546, in The Dictionary of Art, 34 volumes, edited by Jane Turner. London: Macmillan.
- Berty, Adolphe (1860). "Les Métezeau", pp. 119–134, in Les grands architectes français de la Renaissance. Paris: A. Aubry. Copy at Internet Archive.
