= Lüksemburq =

- Municipality
- Location within Azerbaijan
- Coordinates: 40°56′12″N 46°21′09″E
- Country: Azerbaijan
- Rayon: Samukh

Population
  - Total: 894
- Time zone: UTC+4 (AZT)

Lüksemburq (also, Lyuksemburg) is a village and municipality in the Samukh Rayon of Azerbaijan. It has a population of 894.
