= Seyidlər, Samukh =

Seyidlər
- Municipality
- Location within Azerbaijan
- Coordinates: 40°51′10″N 46°17′51″E
- Country: Azerbaijan
- Rayon: Samukh

Population
  - Total: 535
- Time zone: UTC+4 (AZT)
  - Summer (DST): UTC+5 (AZT)

Seyidlər (also, Seydlyar) is a village and municipality in the Samukh Rayon of Azerbaijan. It has a population of 535.
