= Sarıqamış, Samukh =

Sarıqamış
- Municipality
- Location within Azerbaijan
- Coordinates: 40°49′33″N 46°20′12″E
- Country: Azerbaijan
- Rayon: Samukh

Population
  - Total: 545
- Time zone: UTC+4 (AZT)
  - Summer (DST): UTC+5 (AZT)

Sarıqamış (also, Sarykamysh) is a village and municipality in the Samukh Rayon of Azerbaijan. It has a population of 545.
