= Lyuksemburg =

Coordinates: 43°40′N 46°45′E

Lyuksemburg (Russian: Люксембу́рг; lit. Luxembourg) is a rural locality (a selo) in Babayurtovsky District of the Republic of Dagestan, Russia.

It was founded in 1900 by Caucasus Germans as a colony originally named Romanovka (Романовка). It was given its present name in the 1930s, after Rosa Luxemburg. In 1941, the Germans were deported from Lyuksemburg. As of 2007, only two families have been identified as Germans.
