= Alta Vista Botanical Gardens =

Botanical garden in Vista, California

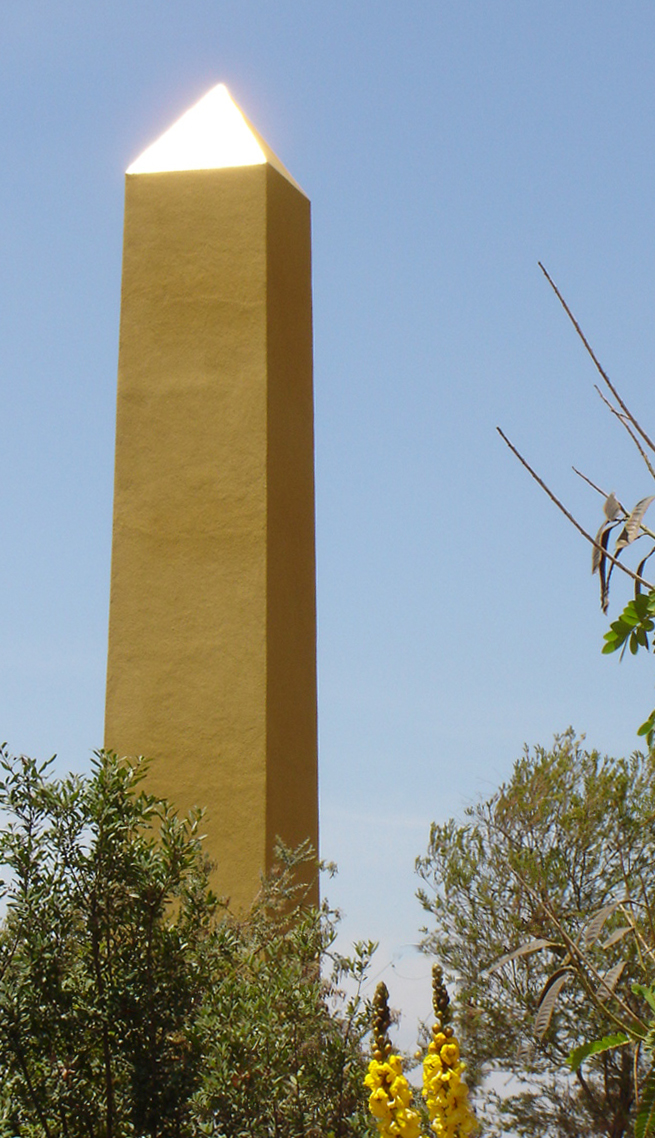
- The Welcome Garden Obelisk

- Location within California Location within the United States
- Type: Botanical garden
- Location: Vista, California
- Coordinates: 33°12′36.63″N 117°13′9.82″W
- Opened: 1999
- Website: https://altavistabotanicalgardens.org/

Alta Vista Botanical Gardens is a botanical garden in Vista, California, United States, established in 1999.

== History ==
Alta Vista Botanical Gardens were established in 1999 by the Botanical Garden Foundation, a nonprofit organization to construct gardens on city-owned land in Vista. In November 2005, the gardens' board of directors adopted a new plan created by Todd Cure', Bryan Morse, and Ron Holloway, for a collection of garden spaces and gathering spots and the Vista City Council unanimously approved the plan.

Various people contributed to the design and growth of the gardens.

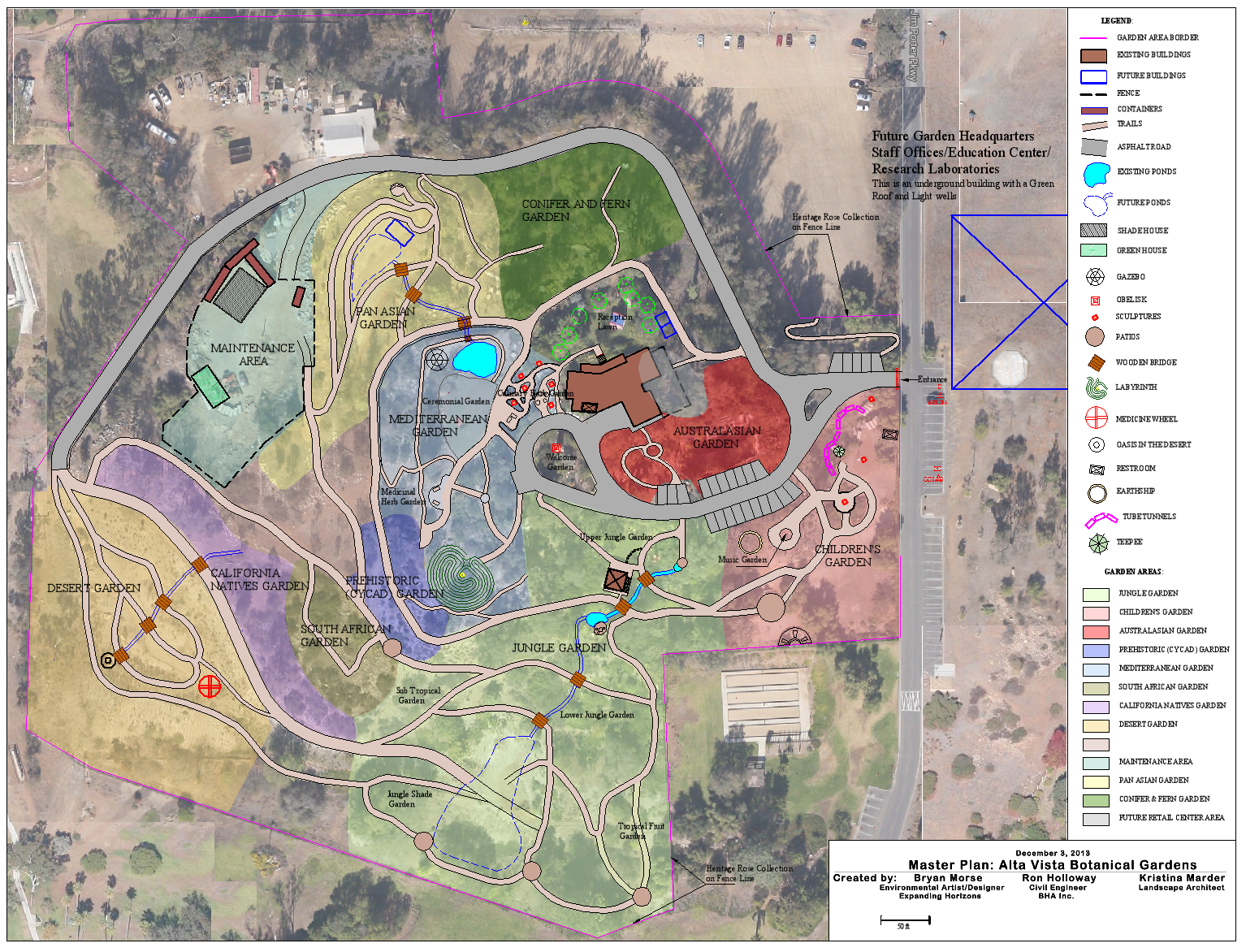
This is the complete Master Plan for Alta Vista Botanical Gardens that was approved by the board of the gardens and subsequently submitted to the city of Vista in the fall of 2013.

== Wildlife ==
The North American Butterfly Association deemed the gardens a butterfly habitat and the National Wildlife Federation designated them a certified wildlife habitat. As part of this certification, the operators have pledged to keep them chemical pesticide-free. Over the years the gardeners have planted thousands of milkweed plants, the host plant for the monarch butterfly. A large part of the Jungle Garden is dedicated to a subtropical food forest for butterflies and birds.

== Zones ==
The gardens have 19 different zones.

- Australian Garden
- California Natives Garden
- Ceremonial Garden
- Children's Garden and Discovery Trail
- Culinary Herbs Garden
- Garden Labyrinth
- Jungle Shade Garden
- Lower Jungle Garden
- Mediterranean Garden
- Medicinal Herb Garden
- Pan-Asian Garden
- Prehistoric Cycad Garden
- Rare Fruit Garden
- Reception Garden
- South African Garden
- Upper and Lower Ponds and Gardens
- Welcome Garden
- Desert Garden
- Medicine Wheel

== Art ==
Below is a list of artists whose art features in the gardens.

- Melissa Ralston: Tail Spin (2009), Blessing Tree (2010)
- Charles Bronson: Sea Breeze (2009), Born to Run (2010)
- Steve Bundy: Calla Lily (2009)
- Anthony Amato: Broken Link (2009)
- Lia Strell: A Creative Bloom (2009), Golden Torsion (2011), Sacred Ginko (2015)
- Buddy Smith: mosaic table top (2009)
- Mindy Rodman and Paul White: Miro Kite (2010)
- Benjamin Lavender: Kite of Paradise (2010)
- Fritzie Urquhart: The Constellation Tree (2010)
- Bryan Morse: Chanson Joyeuse patio (Joyous Song) (2010), I Raggi Crescenti di Amore patio (Expanding Rays of Love) (2010), Three Easter Island Statues (2012), "Mushrooms" (2012), "Tree of Life Bench" (2014) The Mouth of Truth (2015)
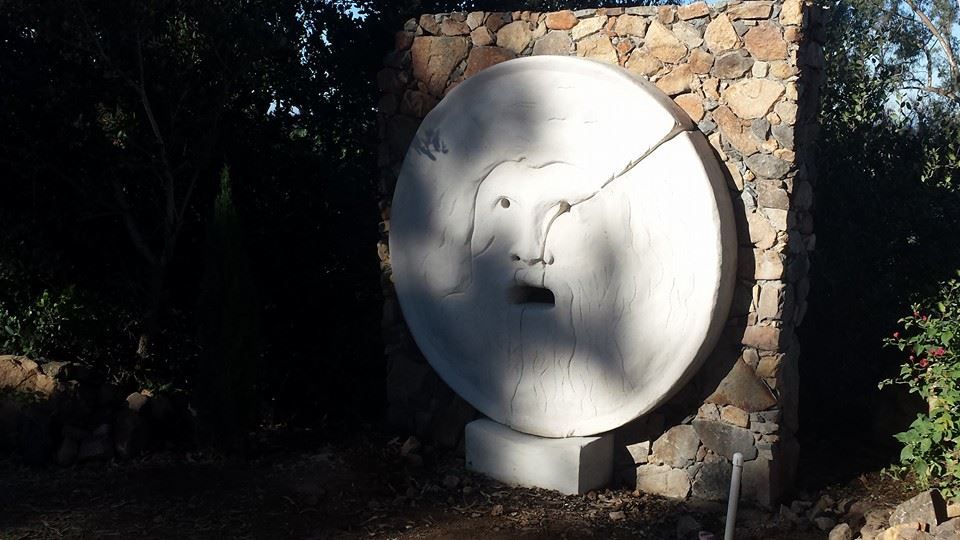
  A replica of the Mouth of Truth, created by Bryan Morse
- Robert Rochin: Piano Pebble Chime (2010), Baobab Tree (2014)
- John Dole: Arborescence (2011)
- Morris Squire: Lamed (2011)
- Phillip Galshoff: Five whimsical sculptures grace the Sharon Kern Culinary Herb Garden Chef "D", Shari Chef, Penelope Hoop, Silly Boy Trey, and Flying Chef (2012)
- Dan Peragine: Transpersonal (2013), located just below the Cycad Garden
- Anne Little: Human Sundial (2014) and over forty mosaic signs created with a grant from the Kenneth A. Picerne Foundation
- Quilted Glories of the Garden - Linda Bannan: "Horse Sculpture", Melanie Chang: "Banana Leaves", Carol Clarke: "Water Lily", Lendia Kinnaman: "Dragon Fly", Carole Lee: "Kite Tail Sculpture", Cheri McClow: "Front of the Garden House", Sue Ramos: "Succulent" (2015)
- Ricardo Breceda: Tyrannosaurus, Triceratops, Velociraptor, Scorpion, Two Giraffes, Agave, Spinosaurus, Serpent (2015)

== Gallery ==
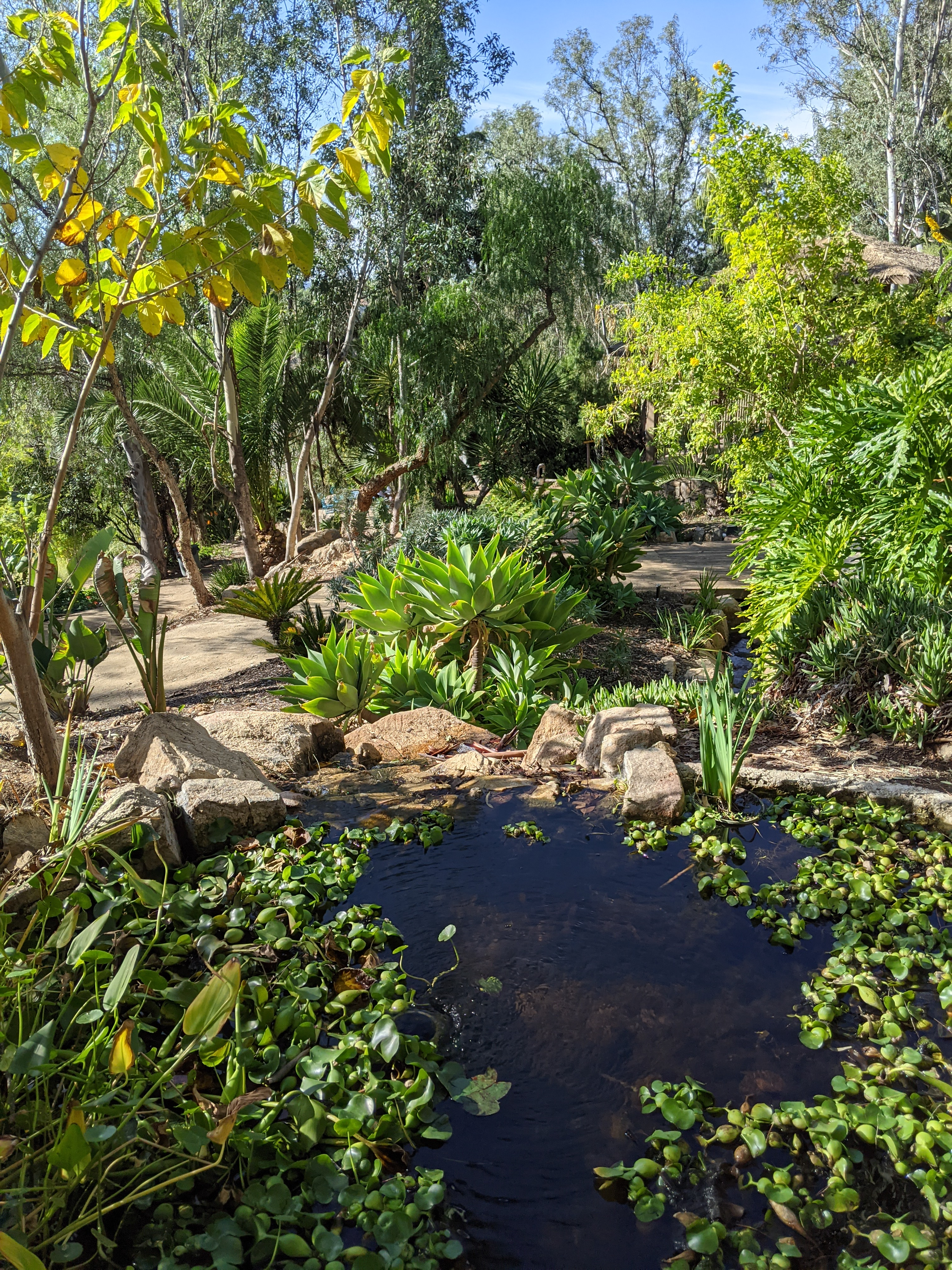

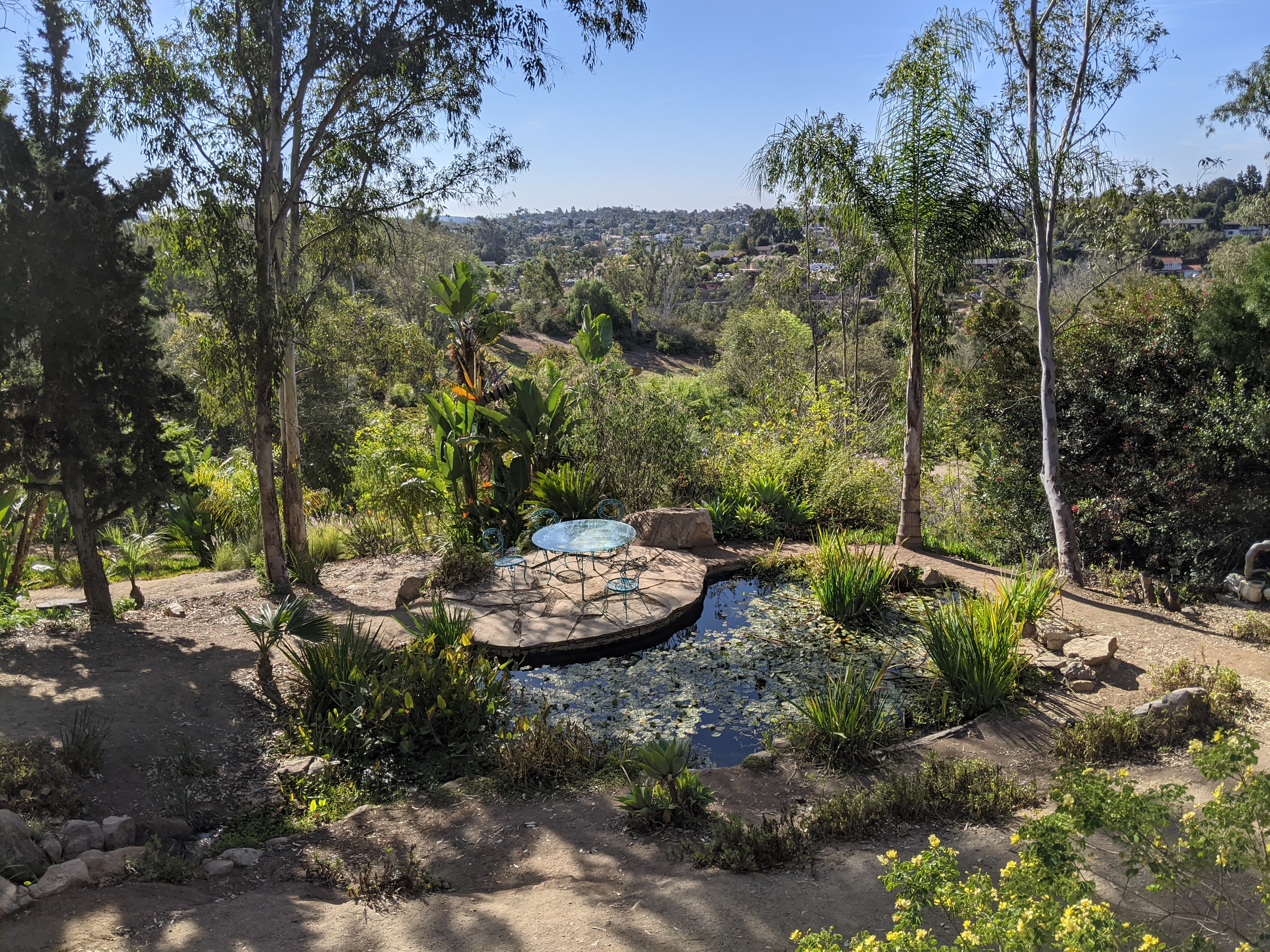

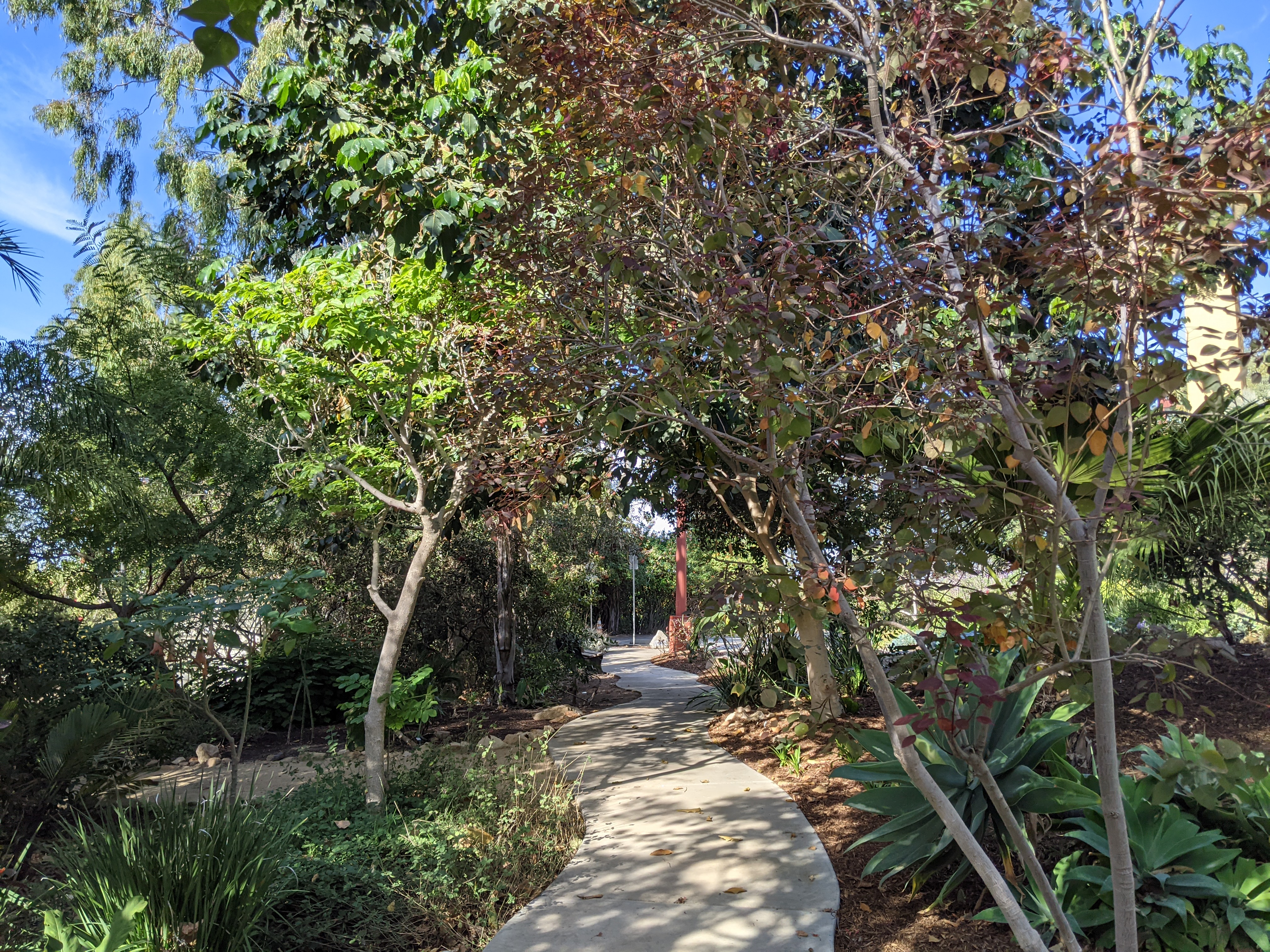

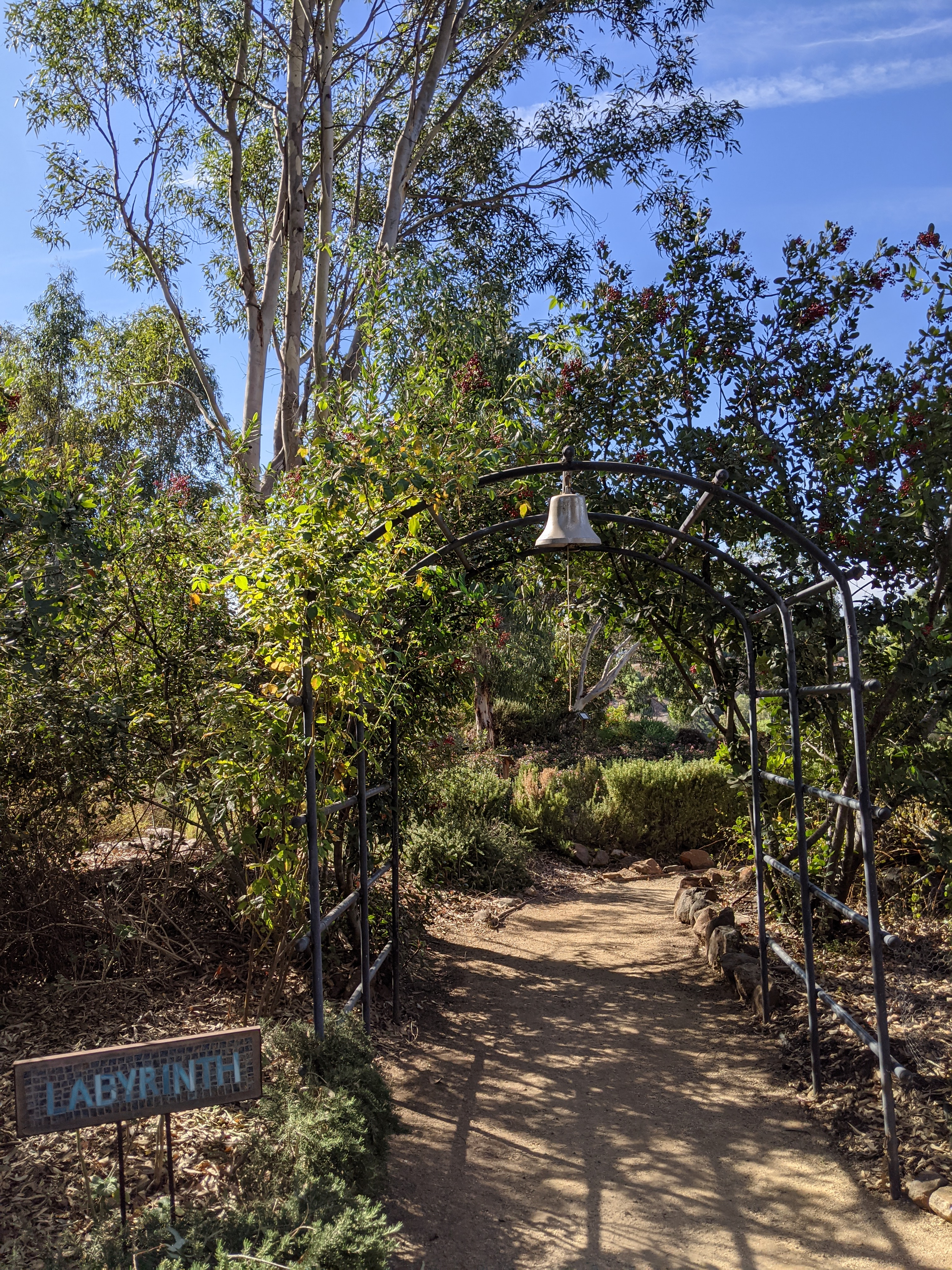

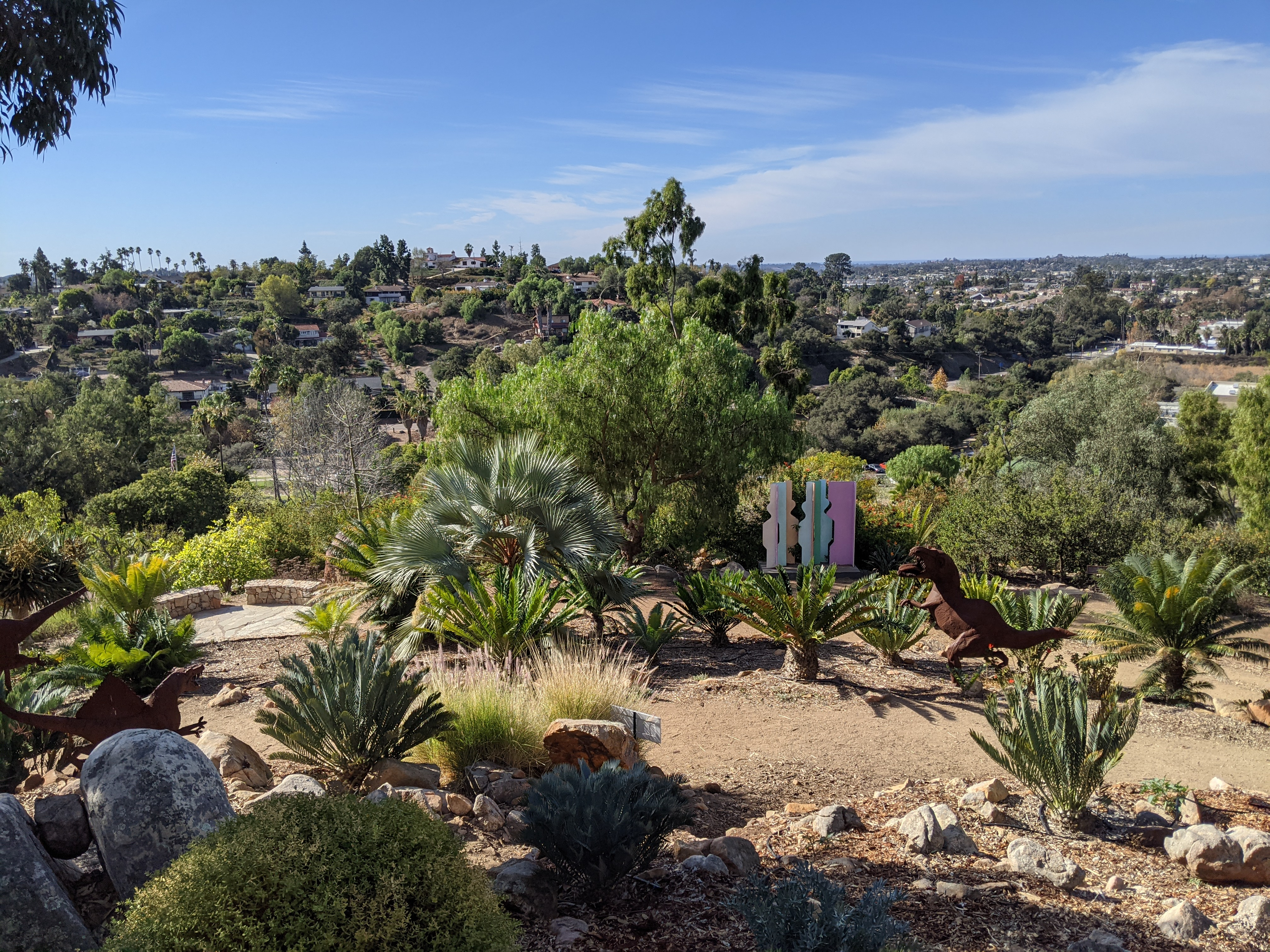

== See also ==
- List of botanical gardens in California
