= Jim Joseph Foundation =

American Jewish philanthropic foundation

- Formation: 2005
- Type: Private foundation
- Purpose: Jewish education for youth and young adults in the United States
- Headquarters: San Francisco, California, United States
- Key people: Barry Finestone (President and CEO); Shira Goodman (Board Chair)
- Budget: approximately $1.45 billion in assets (2024)
- Website: jimjosephfoundation.org

The Jim Joseph Foundation is an American private foundation based in San Francisco, California, dedicated to fostering Jewish learning and education for young Jews in the United States. Since beginning its grantmaking in 2006, the Foundation has awarded more than $800 million in grants, making it one of the largest Jewish philanthropic foundations in the United States. It is legally incorporated as the Shimon Ben Joseph Foundation, after its founder's Hebrew name.

== Founder ==
Jim Joseph (Hebrew: שמעון בן יוסף, Shimon ben Yosef; 1921–2003) was born in Vienna, Austria. In April 1938, as the Hitler regime drove Jews from Austria following the Anschluss, Joseph fled with his family, first to Prague and then, after receiving American visas in March 1939, to the United States, settling in Los Angeles.

After completing an undergraduate degree at the Massachusetts Institute of Technology and an MBA from the Wharton School at the University of Pennsylvania, Joseph entered the real estate business, buying commercial and residential property on the West Coast, including in what would become Silicon Valley. In 1960 he founded the Interland Corporation, which developed, constructed, operated, and acquired executive office parks and apartment complexes in the western United States.

Joseph identified as Orthodox and was a supporter of Jewish day schools and Jewish education throughout his life. In the 1980s he established a charitable trust dedicated to Jewish education. In the years before his death he broadened his focus from day schools to encompass all Jewish children, becoming increasingly interested in Birthright Israel and Jewish summer camps.

Joseph died in 2003 and was buried in Israel. He left the bulk of his estate, estimated at more than $500 million, to the foundation that bore his name. He was explicit that he did not want his family to control the Foundation. His daughter Dvora, who works as an AIDS counselor in Mozambique, serves on the board.

== History ==
The Foundation was formally incorporated in 2005, two years after Joseph's death, and began grantmaking in 2006. It started with a focus on Jewish teens and young adults, then added early childhood education and leadership development for educators and communal professionals as the portfolio grew.

In 2015, to mark its tenth anniversary, the Foundation held a special board meeting in Israel. By that point it had awarded more than $370 million in grants.

In 2017 Barry Finestone became the Foundation's first president and CEO, succeeding founding executive director Chip Edelsberg. Finestone had previously served as CEO of JCC San Francisco and had led the Lisa and John Pritzker Family Fund.

By 2026 the Foundation had awarded more than $800 million in total grants and held assets of approximately $1.45 billion.

== Mission and grantmaking ==
The Foundation funds Jewish education in the United States only, focused on youth, teens, college students, young adults, and families with young children. Capital projects, endowments, and programs outside those age groups are not funded. Grant proposals are by invitation only.

Grants typically range from $25,000 to over $7 million and are structured as multi-year investments. Grants over $250,000 require grantees to set aside 5-8% of the grant for external evaluation. The Foundation made 270 grants totaling $61.5 million in 2023.

Major grantees have included Birthright Israel, BBYO, Moishe House, the Foundation for Jewish Camp, the Shalom Hartman Institute, Hillel International, the iCenter for Israel Education, Mechon Hadar, and Yeshivat Chovevei Torah. The Foundation has given more than $35 million to the Foundation for Jewish Camp alone, including support for the creation of fourteen new specialty camps.

=== Common Era ===
Common Era is the Foundation's in-house research and development arm. It was set up to find ways to reach young Jews who don't connect with the established organizations and institutions the Foundation normally funds. The idea is to develop and test new approaches before deciding whether to scale them.

== Leadership ==
Barry Finestone has served as president and CEO since 2017. The board is chaired by Shira Goodman, a former CEO of Staples Inc. who also chairs Combined Jewish Philanthropies of Boston. The founder's daughter, Dvora Joseph, sits on the board.

== See also ==
- Jewish education in the United States
- Birthright Israel
- Foundation for Jewish Camp
- Moishe House
- Hillel International
