= Bocca della Verità =

Marble mask in Rome, Italy

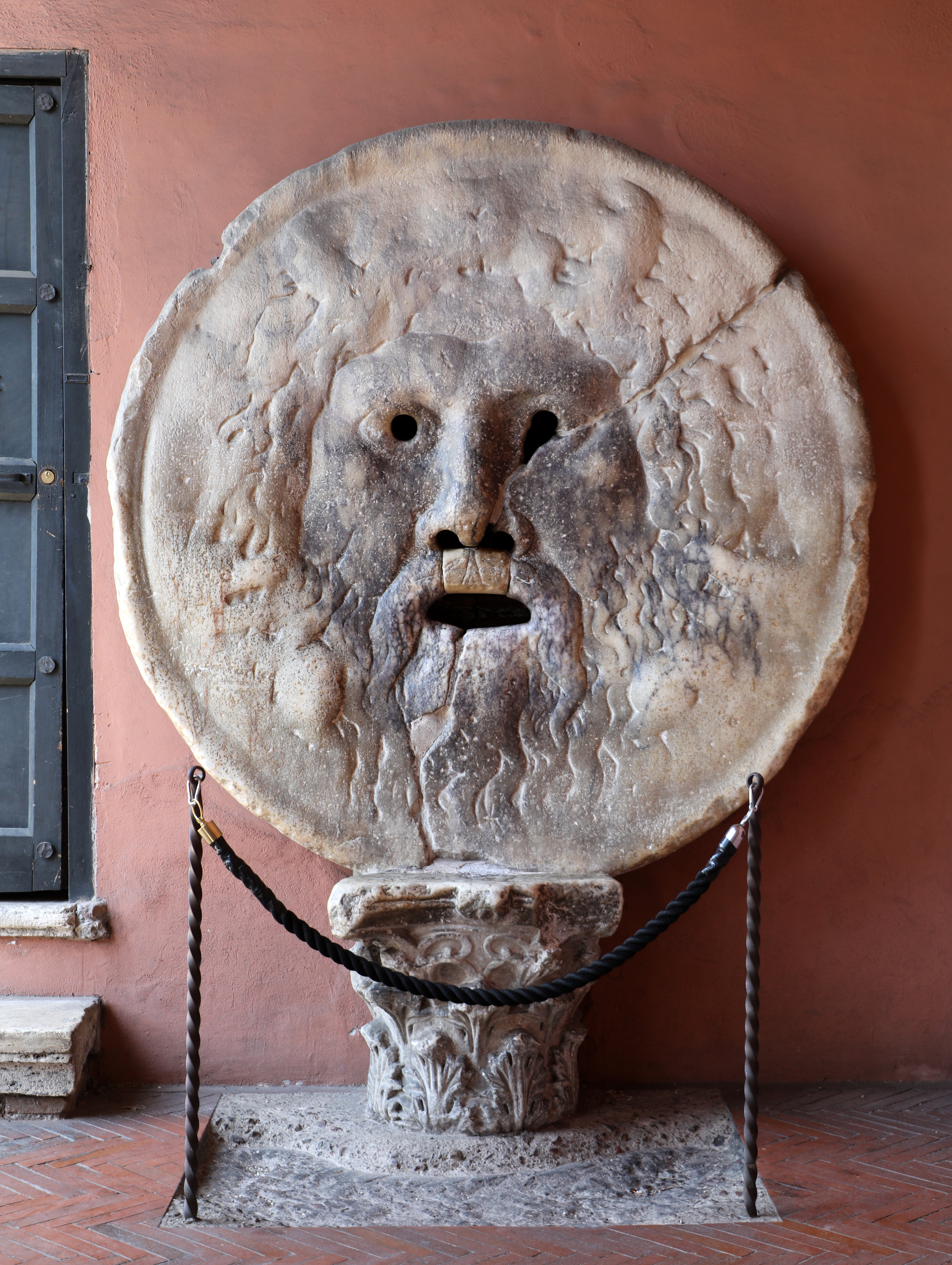
- The Mouth of Truth
- Click on the map for a fullscreen view
- 41°53′17″N 12°28′54″E
- Location: Santa Maria in Cosmedin

The Mouth of Truth (Italian: Bocca della Verità [ˈbokka della veriˈta]) is an ancient Roman marble mask in Rome, Italy, which stands against the left wall of the portico of the Santa Maria in Cosmedin church, at the Piazza della Bocca della Verità, the site of the ancient Forum Boarium (cattle market). According to an enduring medieval legend, it will bite off the hand of any liar who places their hand in its mouth, or, alternatively, any who utters a lie while their hand is in the mouth. It still attracts many visitors who insert their hands.

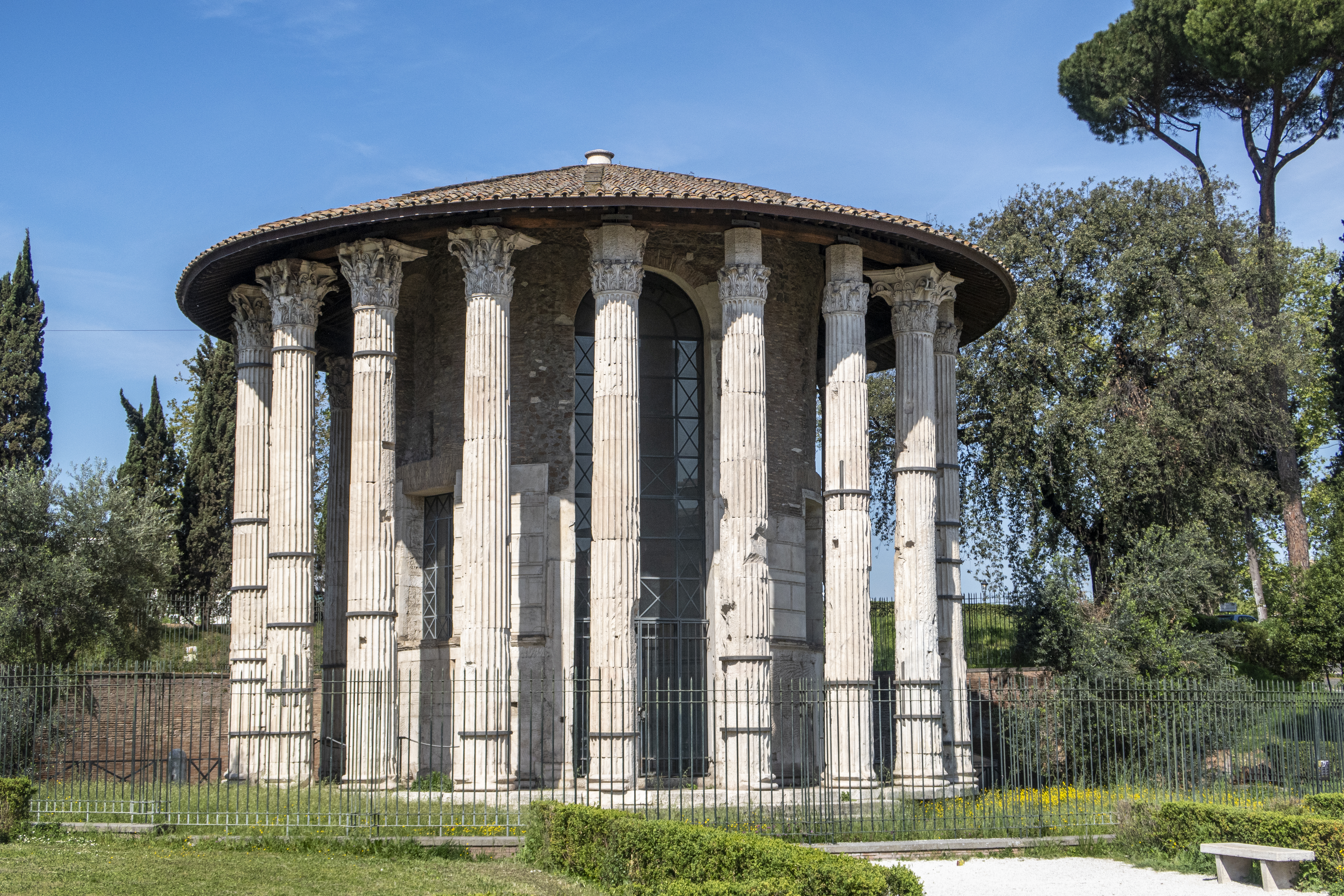
The Temple of Hercules Victor, in the Forum Boarium

The massive marble mask weighs about 1,300 kg (2,900 lb) and probably depicts the face of the sea titan god Oceanus. The eyes, nostrils and mouth are open. Historians are not quite certain what the original purpose of the disc was. It was possibly used as a drain cover in the nearby Temple of Hercules Victor, which had an oculus (a round open space in the middle of the roof) similar to that of the Pantheon. Hence, it could rain inside. It is also thought that cattle merchants used it to drain the blood of cattle sacrificed to the demi-god Hercules.

In the 13th century the disc was probably removed from the temple and placed against the wall of the Santa Maria in Cosmedin. In the 17th century it eventually moved to its current location inside the portico of the church.

== Cultural references and derivative works ==
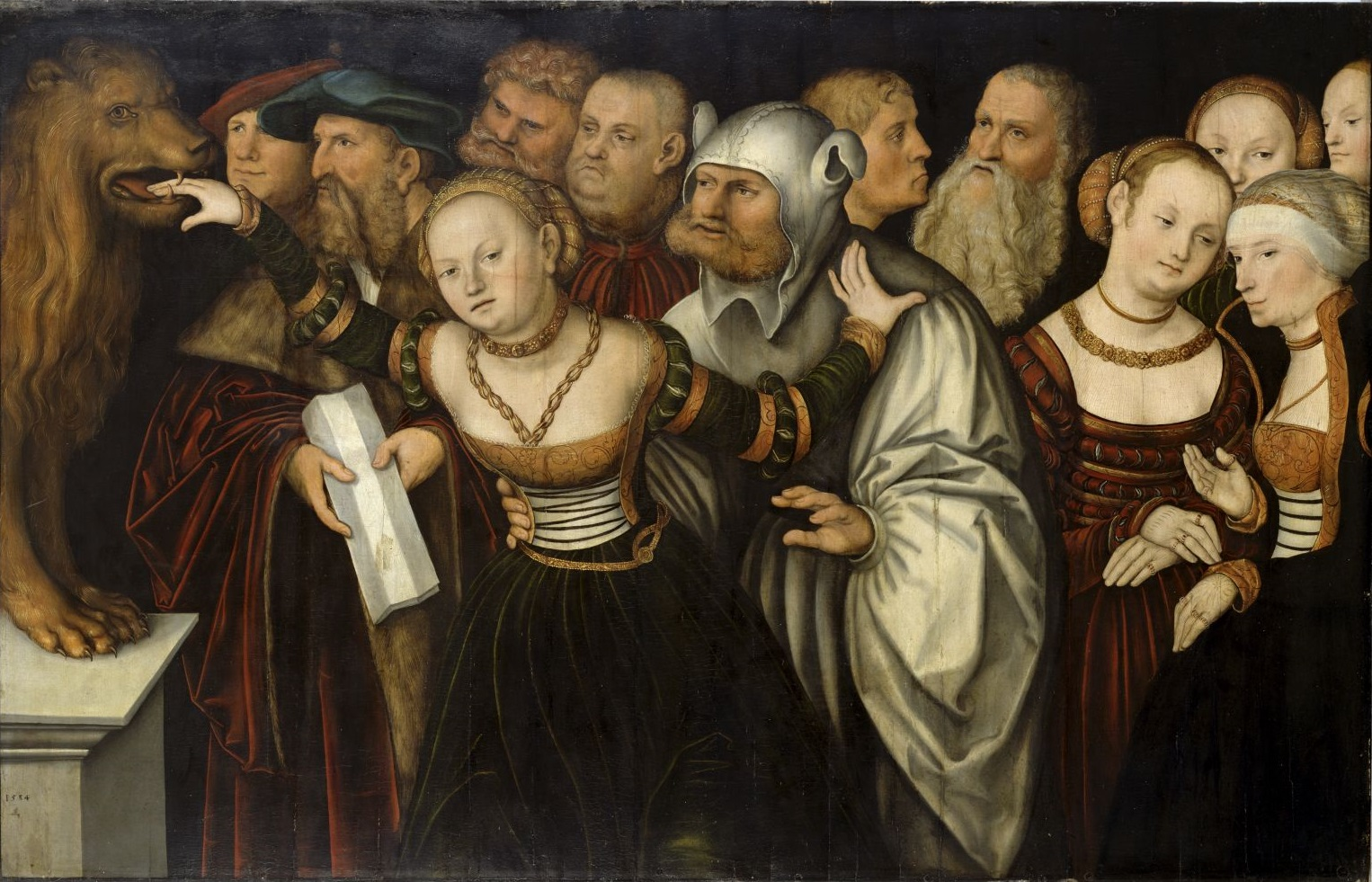
The Mouth of Truth by Lucas Cranach the Elder

The Mouth of Truth has been featured as a theme in historical European art. Lucas Cranach the Elder, a German painter during the Renaissance period, created two paintings depicting a woman placing her hand in the mouth of a statue of a lion while onlookers watched, a subject which was drawn by Albrecht Altdorfer and made into a woodcut by the Dutch printmaker Lucas van Leyden.

The Mouth of Truth appears in the 1953 film Roman Holiday as a storytelling device as Hepburn's and Peck's characters are not truthful with each other. The sculpture is one of six genuine artifacts returned in place replicas in Lupin the Third: Operation Return the Treasure. Robert Silverberg uses the Mouth of Truth as a means of providing the information that leads to the climax of his novella Nightwings. In Het geheim van de afgebeten vingers by Dutch writer Rindert Kromhout, the fingers of lying children are cut off with a scythe by a skeleton who lives in the Capuchin Crypt in the Santa Maria della Concezione dei Cappuccini.

There are a number of Bocca della Verità replicas and derivative works. A full-size reproduction sits in the Alta Vista Gardens in California and one of Jules Blanchard's sculptures in the Luxembourg Garden in Paris depicts a woman with her hand in the sculpture's mouth. Coin-operated fortune teller machines have been developed and installed in different parts of the world, including one on display in the Musée Mécanique in San Francisco.

== Gallery ==
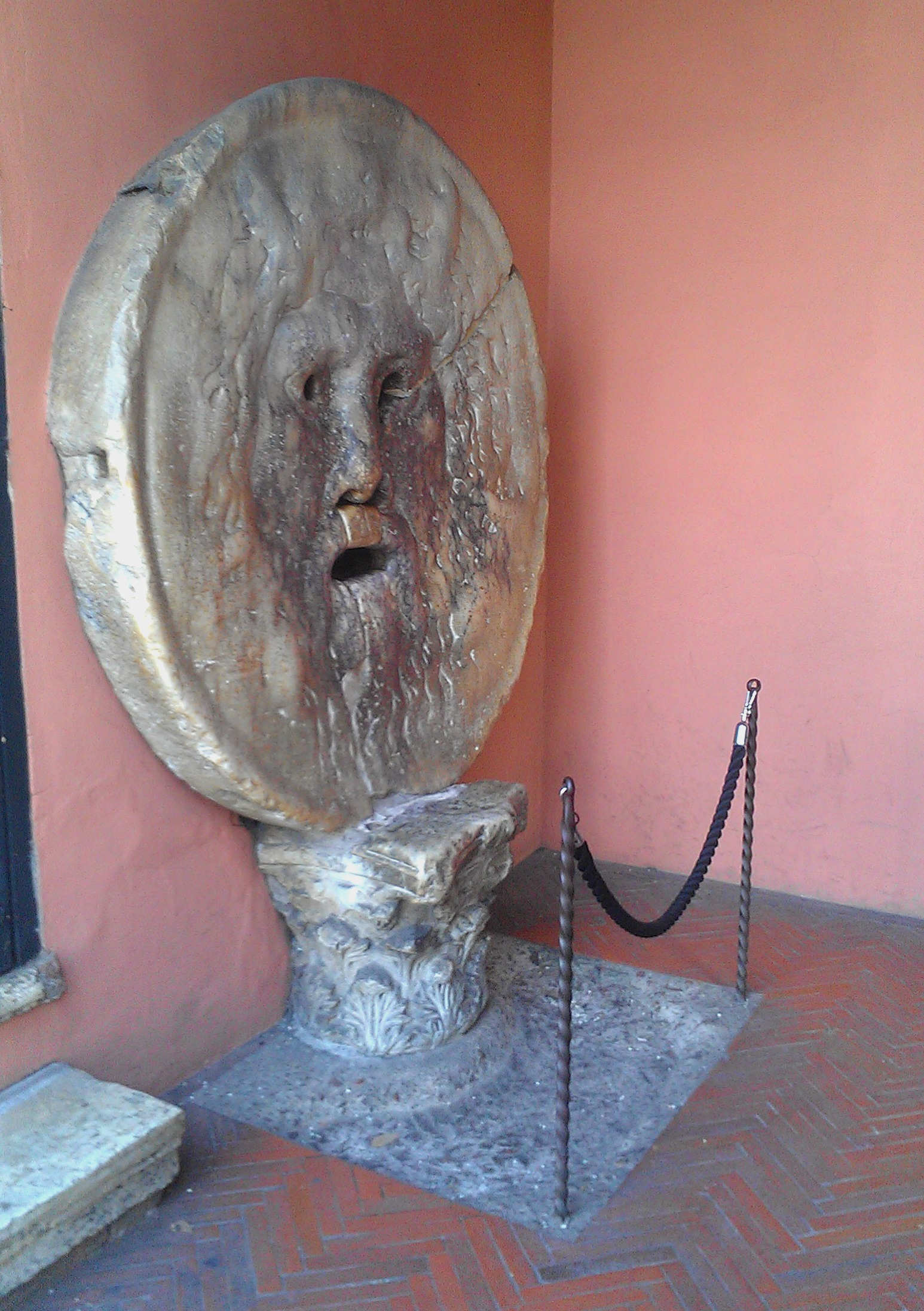
Side view of the Bocca della Verità

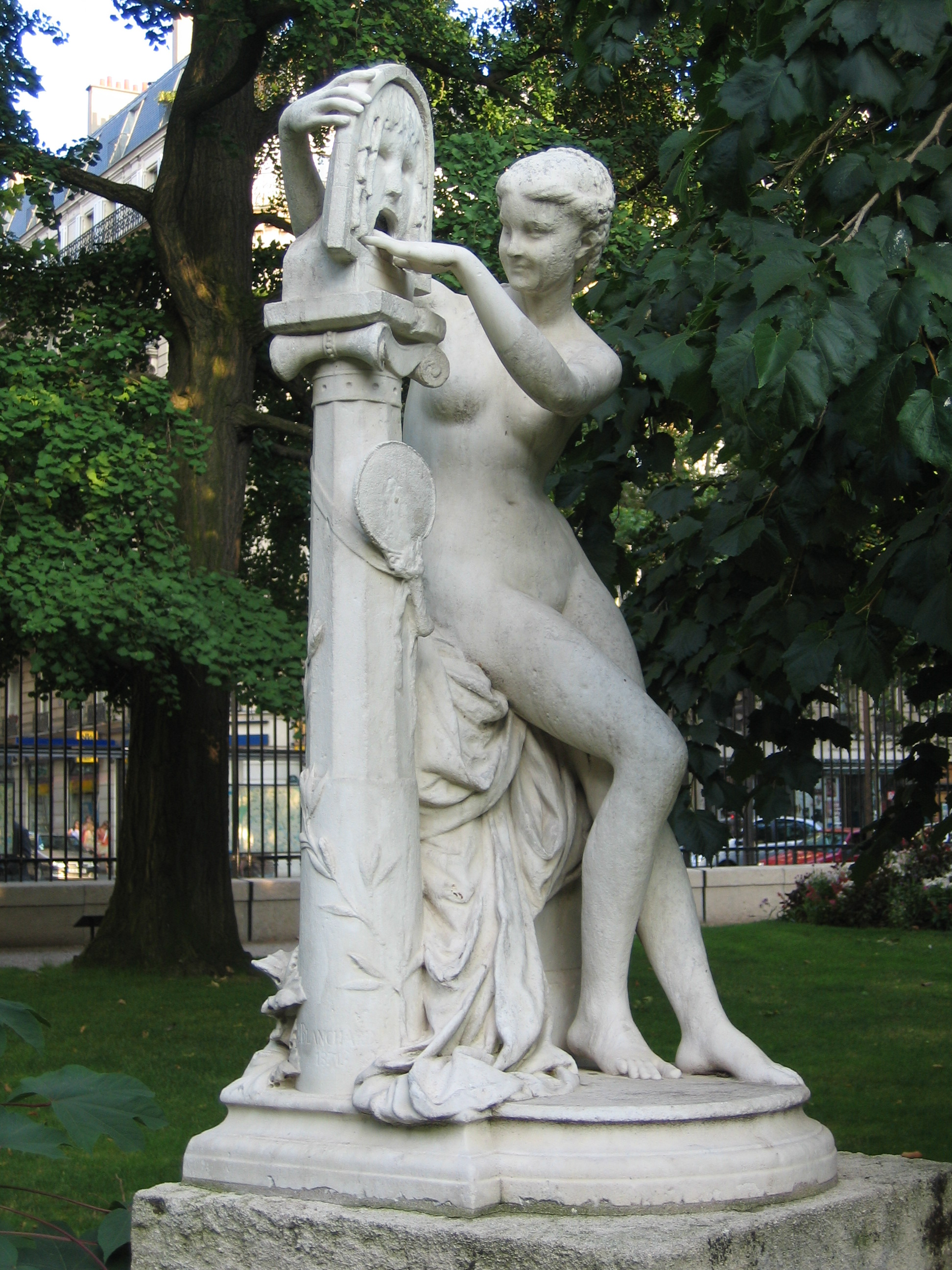
La Bocca della Verità, statue by Jules Blanchard, in the Luxembourg Garden, Paris.

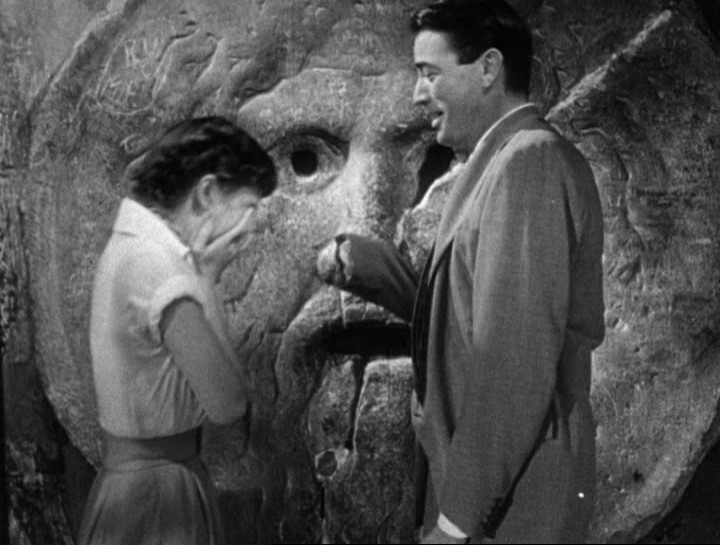
Scene from Roman Holiday with Audrey Hepburn and Gregory Peck

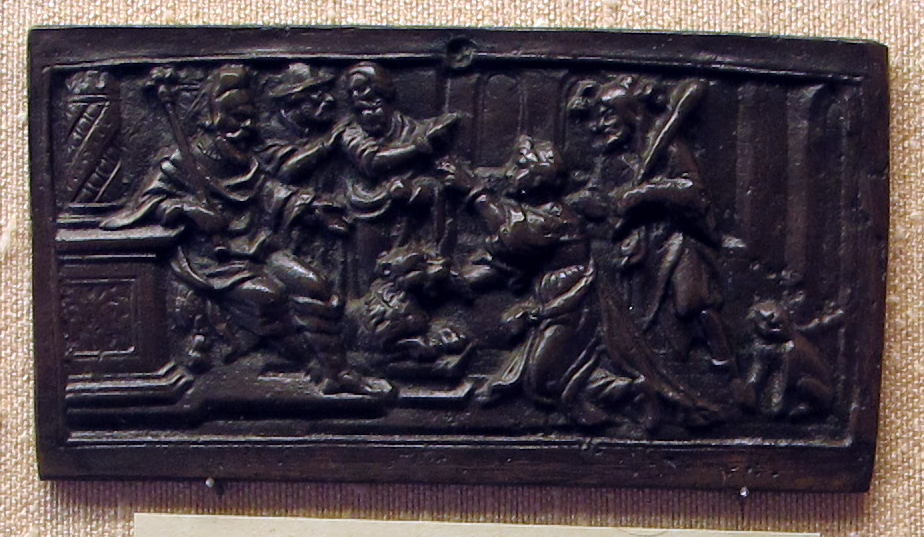
The empress and the Mouth, here shown as a statue of a lion, in a German plaquette of c. 1550.

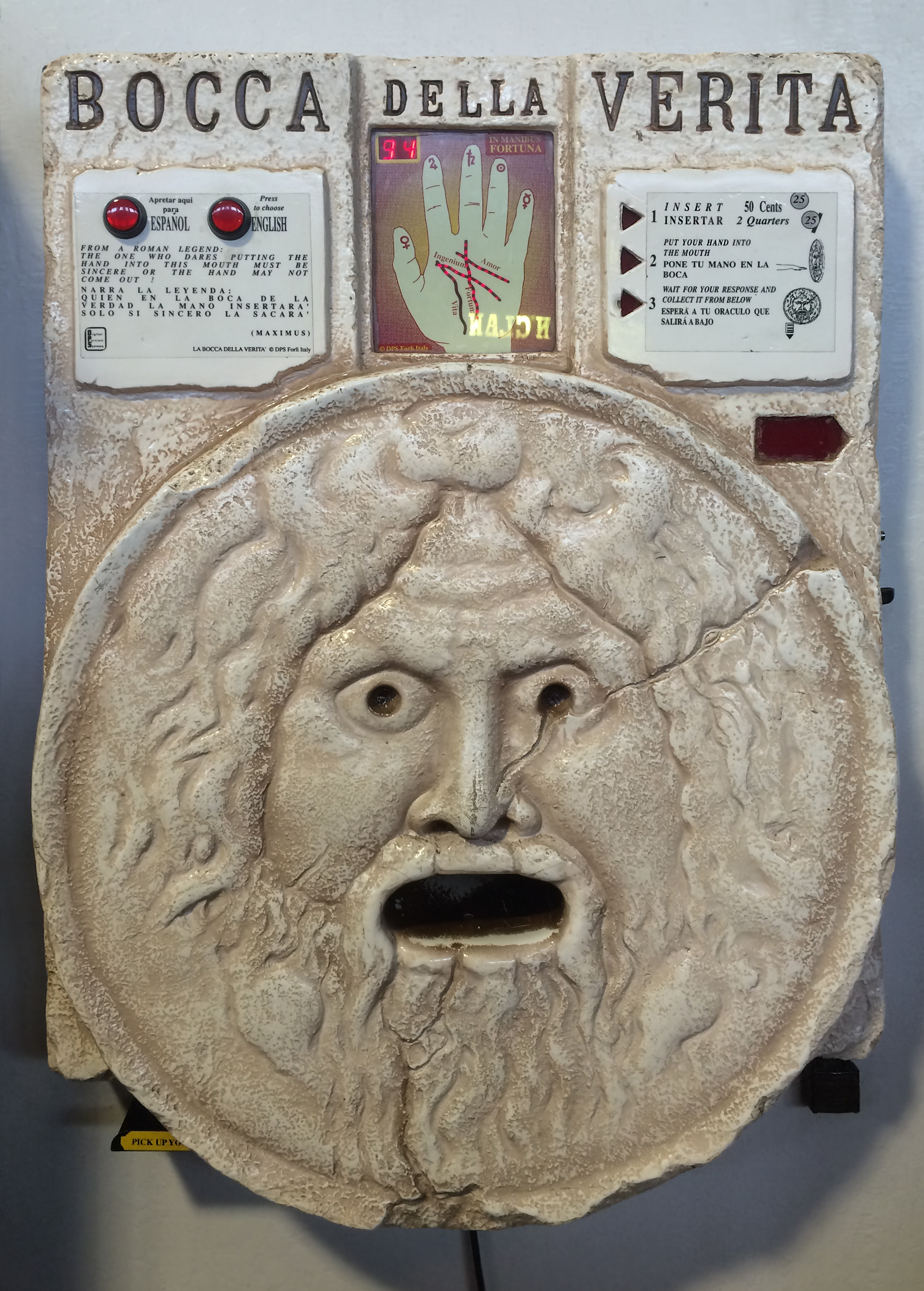
Bocca della Verità fortune teller machine at the Musée Mécanique in San Francisco.

== Notes ==
Preceded by Colossus of Constantine	Landmarks of Rome; Bocca della Verità	Succeeded by Laocoön and His Sons
