= Galleta Meadows Estate =

Desert estate land with statues in Borrego Springs, California

Coordinates: 33.2877°N 116.3755°W

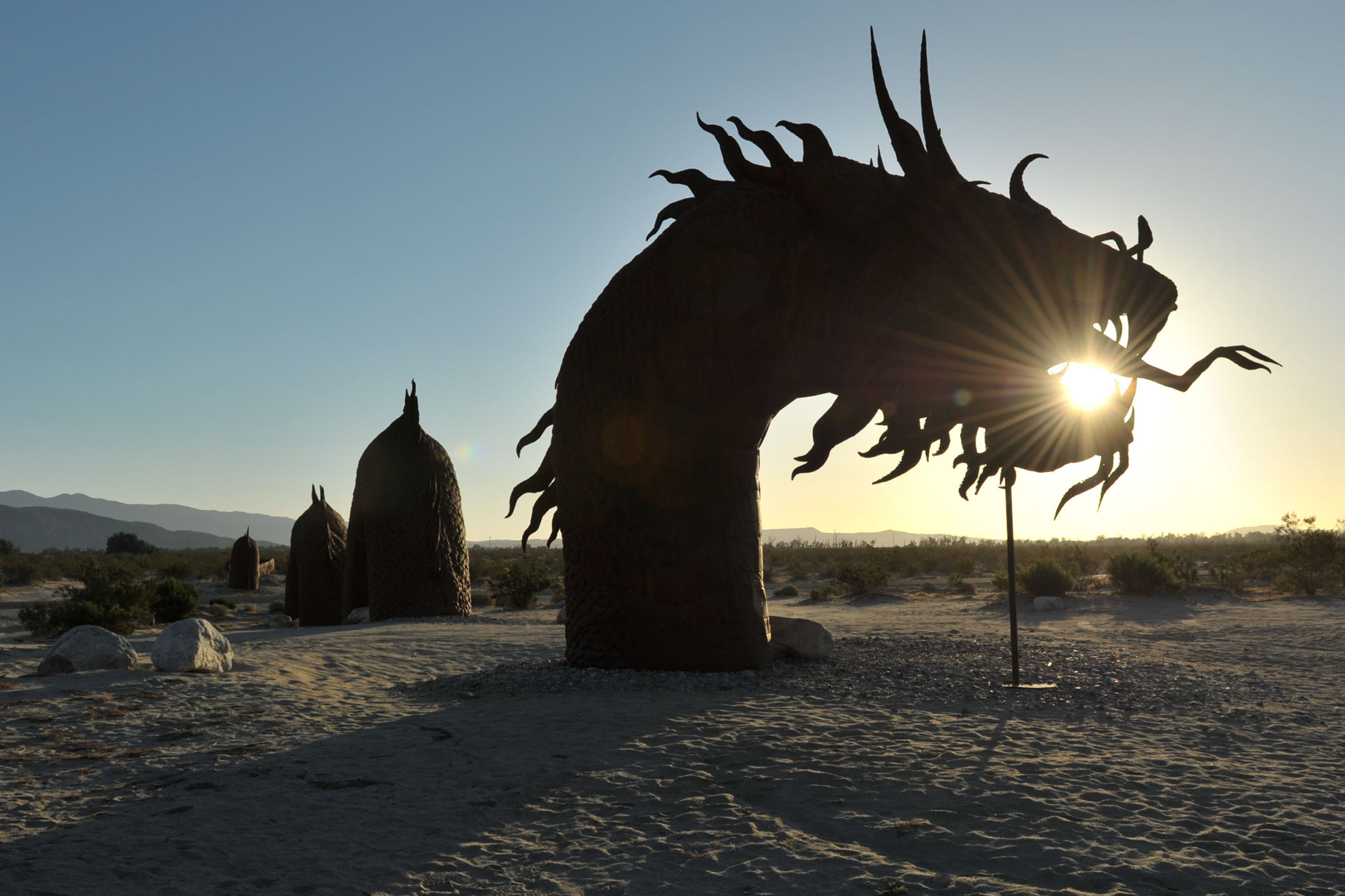
The sand dragon sculpture at sunrise in Borrego Springs, California.

Galleta Meadows Estate is privately owned desert estate land that consists of many separate plots in Borrego Springs, California, and that features over 130 large metal art sculptures. The sculptures were created by Southern California artist Ricardo Breceda via commission from Dennis Avery, the owner of Galleta Meadows. Now deceased and an heir to the Avery label fortune, Mr. Avery located the sculptures on land he purchased for conservation.

Galleta Meadows is unfenced and open to the public for visitation, including hiking, horseback riding, picnicking, photography, and bicycling every day of the year. Borrego Springs is a village completely surrounded by Anza-Borrego Desert State Park, the largest state park in California.

The Galleta Meadows metal sculptures have different themes. The largest theme appears to be of prehistoric animals, including dinosaurs. Other themes have a connection to the desert environment in which they are located, such as desert animals, including scorpions and bighorn sheep. There is also at least one religious sculpture of a priest carrying a cross through the desert. There is also an approximately 350-foot-long dragon that gives the illusion of it snaking into and over top the desert sand.

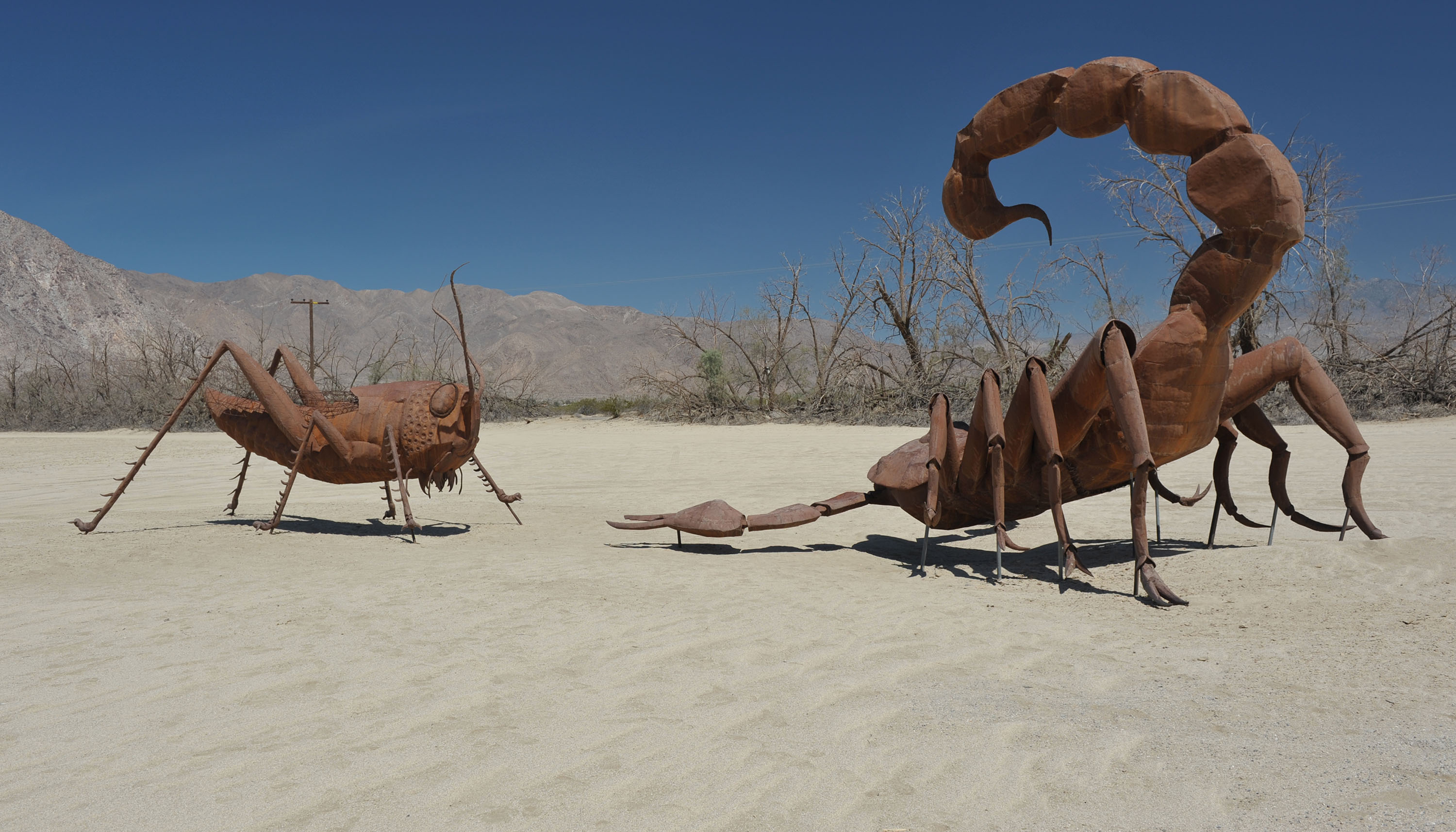
Sculpture of a scorpion vs. a bug

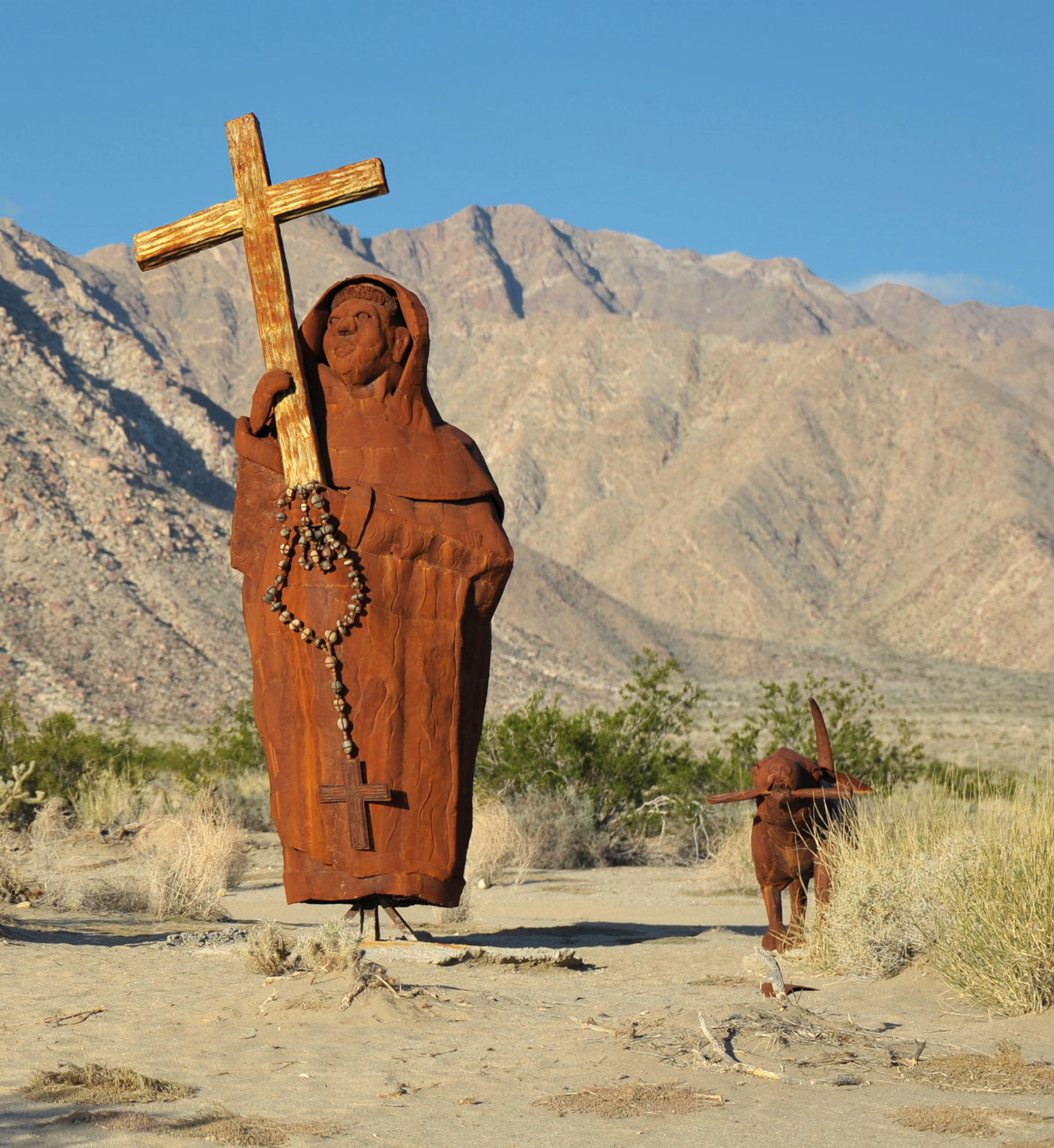
Priest and Cross
