= Borrego Valley Airport =

Airport in California, USA

- IATA: BXS; ICAO: none; FAA LID: L08

Summary
- Airport type: Public
- Owner: County of San Diego
- Serves: Borrego Springs, California
- Elevation AMSL: 520 ft (160 m)
- Coordinates: 33°15′32″N 116°19′16″W
- Interactive map of Borrego Valley Airport

Runways
Direction	Length		Surface
Direction	ft	m	Surface
8/26	5,011	1,527	Asphalt

Statistics (2004)
- Aircraft operations: 22,000
- Based aircraft: 28
- Source: Federal Aviation Administration

Borrego Valley Airport (IATA: BXS, FAA LID: L08) is a county-owned public airport three miles east of Borrego Springs, in San Diego County, California, United States.

== Facilities ==
The airport covers 198 acres (80 ha) at an elevation of 520 feet (158 m). Its one runway (8/26) is 5,011 x 75 ft (1,527 x 23 m) asphalt.

In 2004 the airport had 22,000 aircraft operations, average 60 per day: 99.9% general aviation and 0.1% military. 28 aircraft were then based at the airport: 64% single-engine, 7% multi-engine, 7% helicopter and 21% ultralight.

== Attractions ==
The International Aerobatic Club has a practice and competition area just north of the airport. The area was designated in 1976 and has a waiver from the Federal Aviation Administration. Aerobatic pilots from California and the southwest US regularly use it for practice and major competitive events; users have included three past national champions. Visitors are welcome to come to the airport and watch the flight activity, which does not interfere with other operations. Two annual competitions are sponsored by the San Diego Aerobatic Club, in April and October.

== Past airline passenger service ==
Borrego Springs Airlines, a locally based commuter air carrier, was serving the airport from the late 1960s with scheduled nonstop flights to San Diego (SAN) and Palm Springs (PSP) operated with Cessna 402 twin prop aircraft. By 1975, the airline had changed its name to Sun Aire Lines and upgraded its fleet with 19-passenger seat Swearingen Metro II turboprops and was continuing to operate nonstop service to San Diego and Palm Springs. In the early 1980s the carrier was operating nonstop service to Los Angeles (LAX) as well as direct service to Phoenix (PHX) via intermediate stops in Imperial (IPL) and Yuma (YUM) with Metro II propjets. In 1984, Sun Aire was acquired by SkyWest Airlines which in turn continued to serve Borrego Springs with Fairchild Swearingen Metroliner (Metro III) propjets with flights to several destinations in southern California and Arizona. SkyWest became affiliated with Western Airlines in 1986 and all flights then code-shared with Western, operating as Western Express. One year later in 1987, Western Airlines was merged into Delta Air Lines and all SkyWest flights began operating as Delta Connection. SkyWest/Delta Connection ceased all flights to the Borrego Springs airport on September 30, 1989.

The airport currently does not have scheduled passenger air service.
