= Ricardo Breceda =

American sculptor

- Born: Durango, Mexico
- Known for: Metal sculptures
- Website: ricardoabreceda.com

Ricardo Breceda is an artist most well known for his large metal sculptures of animals. He was born in the town of Villa Unión in the state of Durango, Mexico, but now resides in Aguanga, California. He is unmarried and has two daughters, Lianna and Arabie. He originally worked as a cowboy boots salesman and a construction worker, but a construction accident caused him to leave the latter job. He made a metal sculpture of a Tyrannosaurus rex for his daughter Lianna after she asked for a dinosaur for Christmas following a viewing of Jurassic Park III.

He continued work on sculptures, and was eventually discovered by a philanthropist named Dennis Avery who paid him to construct one piece. Avery then allowed Breceda to build more than 100 sculptures on his property at Galleta Meadows Estate. The sculptures are based on beasts found in a book that depicts now-fossilized creatures in the Anza Borrego Desert as well as mythological creatures. Notable statues made by Breceda include a stagecoach pulled by horses, a large serpent, and a Tyrannosaurus rex.

Breceda was the subject of a book called "Ricardo Breceda: Accidental Artist", and his art was cited by both The Huffington Post and The San Diego Union-Tribune as reasons why people should visit the Anza-Borrego Desert. His outdoor studio location, known for its rustic charm and open landscape, is located on Highway 79 in Aguanga, California. It is accessible to the public as a space to view the variety and scale of the artwork as well as purchase it.

== Early life ==
Ricardo Breceda was born in Durango, Mexico. He is a single parent to his daughter. He later moved to Borrego Springs, California.

== Career ==
This Sea Serpent sculpture is one of Breceda's most famous and largest works.

Breceda worked as a cowboy boots salesman in Durango, among other professions. He also worked as a construction worker, but suffered a construction accident and was injured. His inspiration for the statues came when he brought his then 6-year-old daughter to see the film Jurassic Park III in 2001. After the movie, he asked his daughter what she wanted for Christmas, and she replied that she wanted a dinosaur. A few weeks later, Breceda made his first metal statue, which was a 20-foot tall, 45-foot long Tyrannosaurus rex, for his daughter. This led to him to make more of these statues as a hobby, and eventually people began to show interest and offered to purchase some of his statues. In 2007, a philanthropist named Dennis Avery drove by his studio, then located in Perris, California. Avery asked Breceda to create statues on his property based on beasts featured in a book he financed about now-fossilized creatures once found in the Anza-Borrego Desert. Avery continued to request that Breceda create more of the beasts found in the book until he ran out of animals for Breceda to recreate. Once this happened, Breceda began work on statues based on mythical creatures. When Avery died in 2012, a fund was established to ensure that if storms or vandals damaged his statues, he would be able to repair them. By the time Avery had died, Breceda had finished 130 of the sculptures requested of him by Avery. The sculptures contributed to an increase in economic prosperity in Borrego Springs, which suffered from the Great Recession. He eventually moved to Borrego Springs. His metal works studio is found on Highway 79 just outside of Aguanga, California near the Anza Borrego Desert.

How Breceda became involved in making metal statues caused him to be called "The Accidental Artist." as well as "the Picasso of Steel". His sculptures generally sell anywhere between $100 and $700 and up. According to Breceda, he is a self-taught metal works artist. Some of Breceda's sculptures include a stagecoach pulled by horses, a bear, and a scorpion. Breceda also makes statues of people, most of which are based on people from the old west (such as cowboys) and Native American figures. One of Breceda's most notable sculptures is a 350-foot serpent found in Borrego Springs whose head and body pops out of the sand. Other notable examples of Breceda's work includes fighting dinosaur statues and a series of wild horse sculptures as seen from Highway 79. His daughter assists in the sculpting of his statues.

Breceda hosted an Open House Art and Music Festival at his studio in the Vail Lake Resort RV Park. The event played host to more than 20 local artists, and in addition to selling their art, these artists were also creating art at the event. The artists at the event include airbrush specialists, oil painters, canvas painters, chalk art, face painters and body painters. The event featured live music from bands, such as SantanaWays.

== Recognition ==
According to Borrego Springs' Chamber of Commerce Executive Director Linda Haddock, the town receives thousands of visitors who come to see his art, and four out of five people who haven't been to the town before who visit the Chamber of Commerce office are looking to see his art. A biography about Ricardo Breceda and his art work was written by biographer and historian Diana Lindsay. The book covers his early years as an artist, how he came to get into it, and other aspects of his life and career. Breceda's sculptures were featured in a list of the 11 best art spots in Southern California outside of Los Angeles written by Priscilla Frank for The Huffington Post. The Anza-Borrego Desert was named as The San Diego Union-Tribune's fifth favorite state park, and used a picture of Breceda's serpent sculpture. Another article written by Carolina Gusman for The San Diego Union-Tribune recommended the Anza-Borrego Desert for people looking for a vacation that's low budget due in part to Breceda's sculptures. Alta Vista Botanical Gardens in Vista, California has acquired nine of Ricardo Breceda's sculptures, including a large five-piece serpent sculpture, which have been installed in various locations throughout the Gardens.
