= Borrego Springs, California =

- Census-designated place
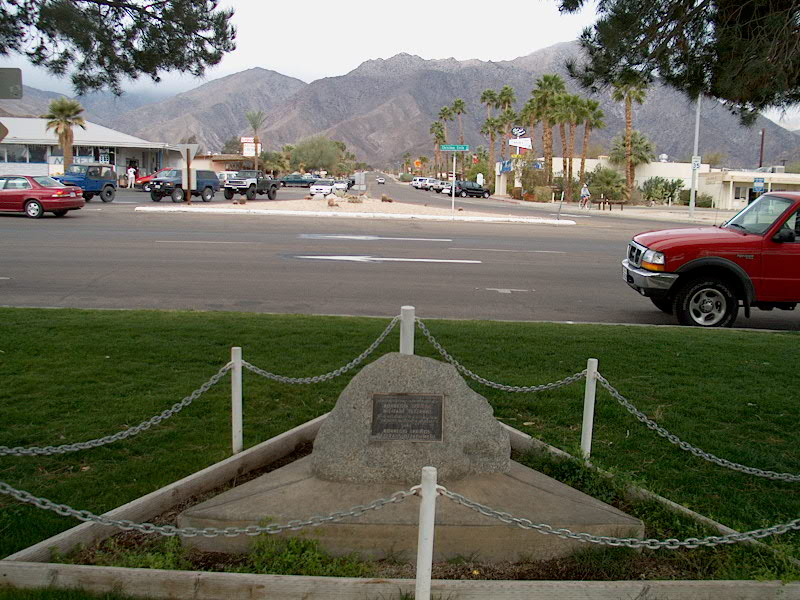
- Downtown as seen from Christmas Circle

- Location in San Diego County and the state of California

- Location in the United States
- Coordinates: 33°14′50″N 116°22′19″W
- Country: United States
- State: California
- County: San Diego

Area
  - Total: 43.41 sq mi (112.42 km^{2})
  - Land: 43.41 sq mi (112.42 km^{2})
  - Water: 0 sq mi (0.00 km^{2}) 0.78%
- Elevation: 597 ft (182 m)

Population (2020)
  - Total: 3,073
  - Density: 70.8/sq mi (27.33/km^{2})
- Time zone: UTC−8 (PST)
  - Summer (DST): UTC−7 (PDT)
- ZIP code: 92004
- Area codes: 442/760
- FIPS code: 06-07596
- GNIS feature IDs: 1652675, 2407888

Borrego Springs is a census-designated place (CDP) in northeastern San Diego County, California. It is located within the Low Desert area of Southern California. The population was 3,073 at the 2020 census. Borrego Springs is surrounded by Anza-Borrego Desert State Park.

== History ==
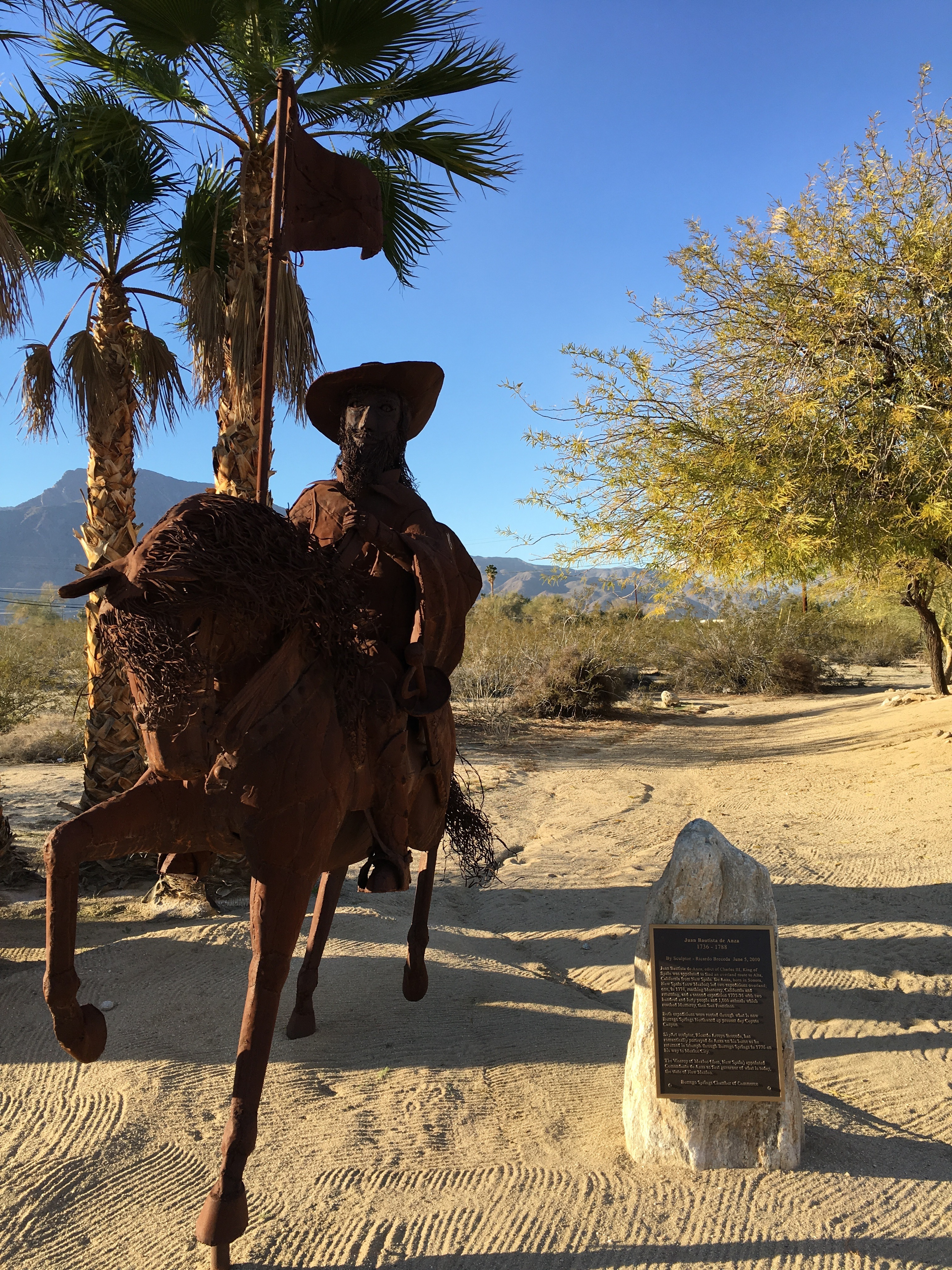
Statue of Juan Bautista de Anza at Anza-Borrego Desert State Park.

Anza-Borrego State Park's name is derived from Juan Bautista de Anza, who notably camped there, and "borrego", which is Spanish for "lamb", in honor of the local herds of bighorn sheep. The area east of town was the site of a vast World War II US Navy training center, the Borrego Valley Maneuver Area, with supporting camps and airstrips.

== Geography ==
Borrego Springs is on the floor of the Borrego Valley, which lies at the Sonoran Desert ecoregion's western edge. The village and surrounding countryside have a wide variety of desert flora and fauna. One iconic species found in the Borrego Springs area is the California Fan Palm, Washingtonia filifera, a lower risk/near-threatened species and the only palm native to the western United States. An abandoned calcite mine, dating to World War II, is on the northeast slope of the Santa Rosa Mountains in the state park.

=== Climate ===
Borrego Springs has a dry-summer hot desert climate (Köppen climate classification: BWhs). There are an average of 176.6 days with highs of 90 °F (32 °C) or higher and an average of only 1.4 days with lows of 32 °F (0 °C) or lower. The record high temperature was 122 °F (50 °C) on June 25, 1990. The record low temperature was 20 °F (−7 °C) on January 5, 1971. The average annual precipitation is 5.21 inches (132 mm) and there are an average of 22.2 days with measurable precipitation. The wettest year was 1983, with 18.28 inches (464 mm), and the driest was 1953, with 1.35 inches (34 mm). The most rainfall in one month was 8.78 inches (223 mm) in January 1993. The most rainfall in 24 hours was 2.73 inches (69 mm) on August 17, 1977. Although snow rarely falls in the lowlands, 6.5 inches fell in December 1967.

Climate data for Borrego Springs, California 1991–2020 normals, extremes 1965–present
Month	Jan	Feb	Mar	Apr	May	Jun	Jul	Aug	Sep	Oct	Nov	Dec	Year
Record high °F (°C)	90 (32)	98 (37)	106 (41)	111 (44)	114 (46)	122 (50)	121 (49)	120 (49)	117 (47)	113 (45)	98 (37)	89 (32)	122 (50)
Mean maximum °F (°C)	80.2 (26.8)	83.3 (28.5)	91.7 (33.2)	100.5 (38.1)	105.8 (41.0)	113.5 (45.3)	116.5 (46.9)	115.1 (46.2)	110.6 (43.7)	102.1 (38.9)	89.8 (32.1)	79.1 (26.2)	117.6 (47.6)
Mean daily maximum °F (°C)	69.7 (20.9)	72.3 (22.4)	79.0 (26.1)	85.3 (29.6)	93.2 (34.0)	102.9 (39.4)	107.4 (41.9)	106.8 (41.6)	101.1 (38.4)	90.2 (32.3)	77.9 (25.5)	68.5 (20.3)	87.9 (31.1)
Daily mean °F (°C)	57.6 (14.2)	59.8 (15.4)	65.3 (18.5)	70.5 (21.4)	77.7 (25.4)	86.2 (30.1)	92.3 (33.5)	92.1 (33.4)	86.4 (30.2)	76.0 (24.4)	64.9 (18.3)	56.8 (13.8)	73.8 (23.2)
Mean daily minimum °F (°C)	45.5 (7.5)	47.4 (8.6)	51.7 (10.9)	55.7 (13.2)	62.2 (16.8)	69.5 (20.8)	77.1 (25.1)	77.5 (25.3)	71.7 (22.1)	61.8 (16.6)	51.9 (11.1)	45.0 (7.2)	59.8 (15.4)
Mean minimum °F (°C)	34.4 (1.3)	36.8 (2.7)	39.6 (4.2)	44.4 (6.9)	49.5 (9.7)	56.6 (13.7)	67.0 (19.4)	66.3 (19.1)	58.9 (14.9)	50.2 (10.1)	40.2 (4.6)	34.4 (1.3)	31.7 (−0.2)
Record low °F (°C)	20 (−7)	24 (−4)	28 (−2)	28 (−2)	34 (1)	45 (7)	56 (13)	55 (13)	49 (9)	33 (1)	31 (−1)	23 (−5)	20 (−7)
Average precipitation inches (mm)	1.16 (29)	1.24 (31)	0.62 (16)	0.18 (4.6)	0.05 (1.3)	0.01 (0.25)	0.25 (6.4)	0.32 (8.1)	0.15 (3.8)	0.20 (5.1)	0.22 (5.6)	0.81 (21)	5.21 (132.15)
Average precipitation days (≥ 0.01 in)	4.0	4.1	3.1	1.4	0.7	0.1	1.1	1.2	1.0	0.7	1.4	3.4	22.2
Source: NOAA

== Demographics ==
Historical population
Census	Pop.	Note	%±
1980	1,405		—
1990	2,244		59.7%
2000	2,535		13.0%
2010	3,429		35.3%
2020	3,073		−10.4%
U.S. Decennial Census; 1860–1870 1880-1890; 1900 1910 1920; 1930 1940 1950; 1960 1970 1980; 1990 2000 2010; 2020

Borrego Springs was first listed as a census designated place in the 1980 U.S. census.

=== Racial and ethnic composition ===
Borrego Springs CDP, California – Racial and ethnic composition Note: the US Census treats Hispanic/Latino as an ethnic category. This table excludes Latinos from the racial categories and assigns them to a separate category. Hispanics/Latinos may be of any race.
Race / Ethnicity (NH = Non-Hispanic)	Pop 2000	Pop 2010	Pop 2020	% 2000	% 2010	% 2020
White alone (NH)	1,655	2,140	1,729	65.29%	62.41%	56.26%
Black or African American alone (NH)	23	13	13	0.91%	0.38%	0.42%
Native American or Alaska Native alone (NH)	10	15	18	0.39%	0.44%	0.59%
Asian alone (NH)	6	13	25	0.24%	0.38%	0.81%
Native Hawaiian or Pacific Islander alone (NH)	0	1	0	0.00%	0.03%	0.00%
Other race alone (NH)	0	1	20	0.00%	0.03%	0.65%
Mixed race or Multiracial (NH)	19	28	95	0.75%	0.82%	3.09%
Hispanic or Latino (any race)	822	1,218	1,173	32.43%	35.52%	38.17%
Total	2,535	3,429	3,073	100.00%	100.00%	100.00%

=== 2020 census ===
As of the 2020 census, Borrego Springs had a population of 3,073 and a population density of 70.8 inhabitants per square mile (27.3/km^{2}).

The median age was 60.2 years. Of residents, 14.5% were under the age of 18, 4.6% were aged 18 to 24, 15.4% were aged 25 to 44, 24.5% were aged 45 to 64, and 41.0% were 65 years of age or older. For every 100 females, there were 101.2 males, and for every 100 females age 18 and over, there were 102.1 males age 18 and over.

The census reported that 99.7% of the population lived in households and 0.3% were institutionalized. There were 1,453 households, of which 14.5% had children under the age of 18 living in them. Of all households, 44.9% were married-couple households, 5.9% were cohabiting couple households, 24.0% were households with a male householder and no spouse or partner present, and 25.3% were households with a female householder and no spouse or partner present. About 37.0% of all households were made up of individuals and 25.0% had someone living alone who was 65 years of age or older. The average household size was 2.11, and there were 826 families (56.8% of all households).

There were 2,522 housing units at an average density of 58.1 units per square mile (22.4 units/km^{2}), of which 42.4% were vacant and 57.6% were occupied. Of occupied units, 77.0% were owner-occupied and 23.0% were occupied by renters. The homeowner vacancy rate was 3.9% and the rental vacancy rate was 17.7%.

Of residents, 0.0% lived in urban areas and 100.0% lived in rural areas.

=== Income and poverty ===
In 2023, the US Census Bureau estimated that the median household income was $83,836, and the per capita income was $52,124. About 2.3% of families and 2.1% of the population were below the poverty line.

=== 2010 census ===
The 2010 United States census reported that Borrego Springs had a population of 3,429. The population density was 79.0 inhabitants per square mile (30.5/km^{2}). The racial makeup of Borrego Springs was 2,766 (80.7%) White, 20 (0.6%) African American, 34 (1.0%) Native American, 22 (0.6%) Asian, 5 (0.1%) Pacific Islander, 500 (14.6%) from other races, and 82 (2.4%) from two or more races. Hispanic or Latino of any race were 1,218 persons (35.5%).

The Census reported that 3,429 people (100% of the population) lived in households, 0 (0%) lived in non-institutionalized group quarters, and 0 (0%) were institutionalized.

There were 1,571 households, out of which 283 (18.0%) had children under the age of 18 living in them, 828 (52.7%) were opposite-sex married couples living together, 82 (5.2%) had a female householder with no husband present, 57 (3.6%) had a male householder with no wife present. There were 85 (5.4%) unmarried opposite-sex partnerships, and 13 (0.8%) same-sex married couples or partnerships. 507 households (32.3%) were made up of individuals, and 262 (16.7%) had someone living alone who was 65 years of age or older. The average household size was 2.18. There were 967 families (61.6% of all households); the average family size was 2.76.

The population was spread out, with 592 people (17.3%) under the age of 18, 165 people (4.8%) aged 18 to 24, 477 people (13.9%) aged 25 to 44, 1,044 people (30.4%) aged 45 to 64, and 1,151 people (33.6%) who were 65 years of age or older. The median age was 56.6 years. For every 100 females, there were 99.5 males. For every 100 females age 18 and over, there were 100.4 males.

There were 2,611 housing units at an average density of 60.1 per square mile (23.2/km^{2}), of which 1,235 (78.6%) were owner-occupied, and 336 (21.4%) were occupied by renters. The homeowner vacancy rate was 8.0%; the rental vacancy rate was 12.1%. 2,593 people (75.6% of the population) lived in owner-occupied housing units and 836 people (24.4%) lived in rental housing units.

== Arts and culture ==
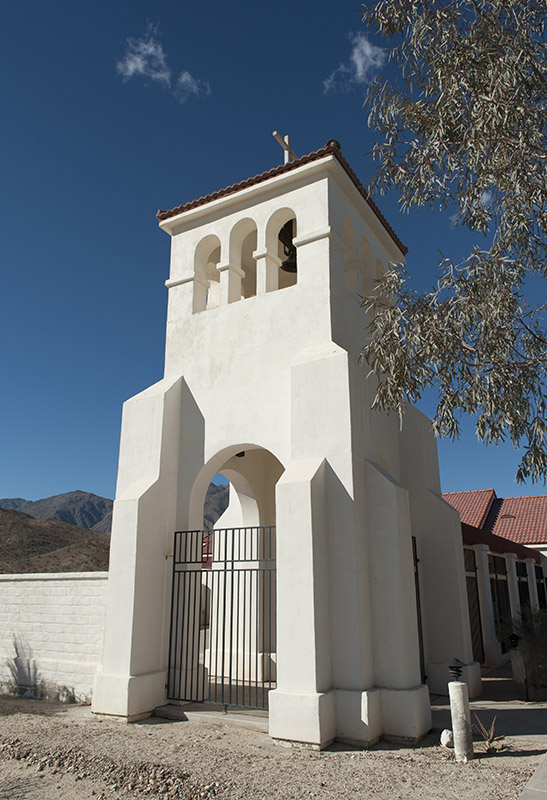
Lutheran Church in Borrego Springs

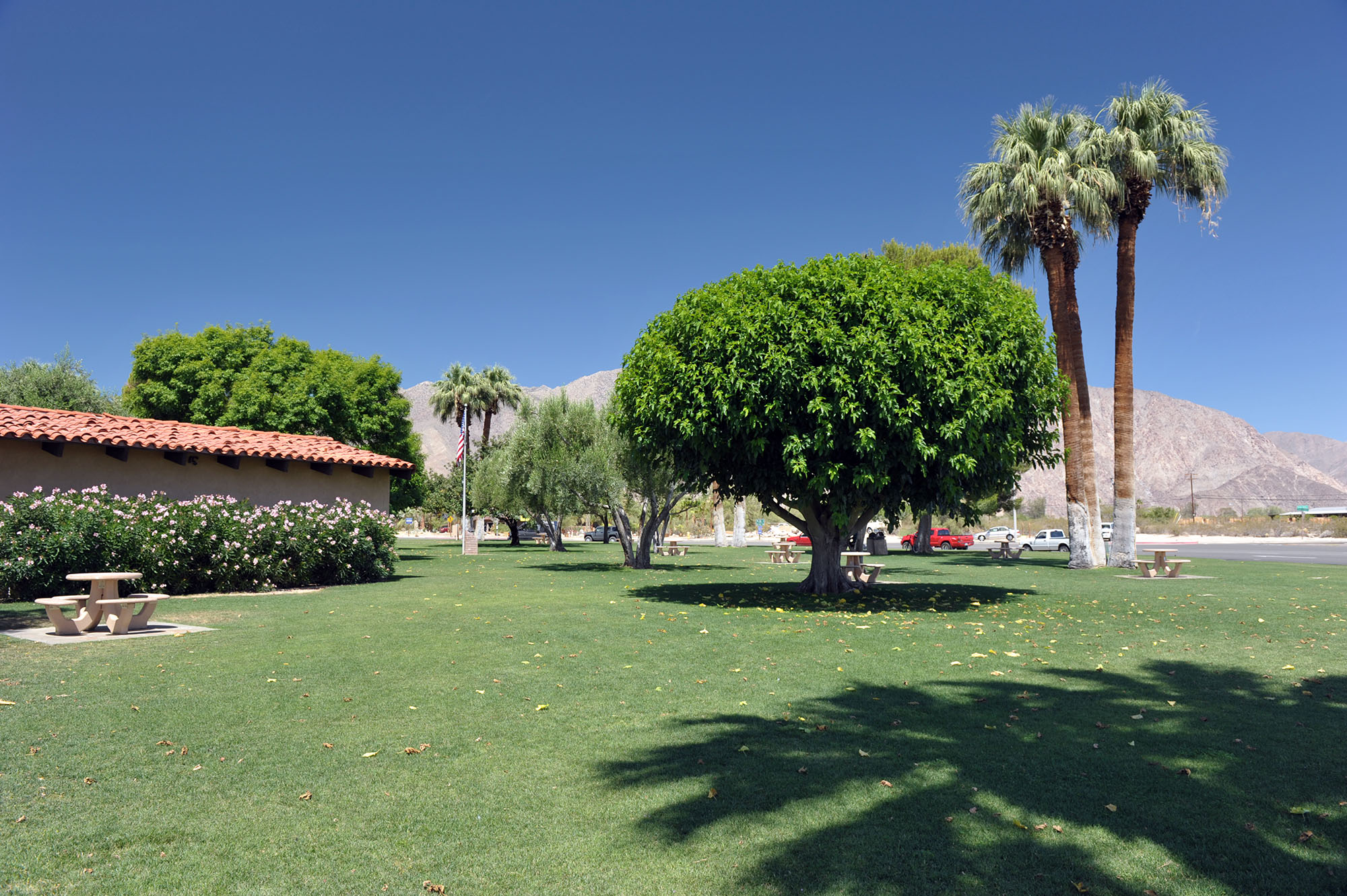
Christmas Circle

Borrego Springs has pueblo-style, modern architecture and ranch-style house architecture. A local landmark is the traffic roundabout between the airport and downtown, Christmas Circle. The town includes a branch of the San Diego County Library. Anza-Borrego Desert State Park surrounds the town. There are four public golf courses, a tennis center, and horseback riding, and it is a destination for snowbirds. Tourism is Borrego Springs's primary industry.

The village of Borrego Springs is recognized as a designated International Dark Sky Community by the International Dark-Sky Association (IDA). Borrego Springs has no stoplights, and nighttime lighting is kept to a minimum to protect the view of the night sky. The International Dark-Sky Association designated it as California's first International Dark-Sky Community. It is a center for public astronomy activities throughout the year.

=== Attractions ===
Members of the International Aerobatic Club have established a practice and competition area adjacent to and directly north of the Borrego Valley Airport. The area was first designated in 1976 and has an operational waiver approved by the Federal Aviation Administration. Aerobatic pilots from California and the southwest U.S. regularly use the airspace for practice and major competitive events; users have included three past national champions. Visitors are welcome to come to the airport and watch the flight activity, which does not interfere with other airport operations. The San Diego Aerobatic Club sponsors two annual competition events, in April and October.

More than 130 large metal statues of animals by sculptor Ricardo Breceda can be found in Galleta Meadows Estate.

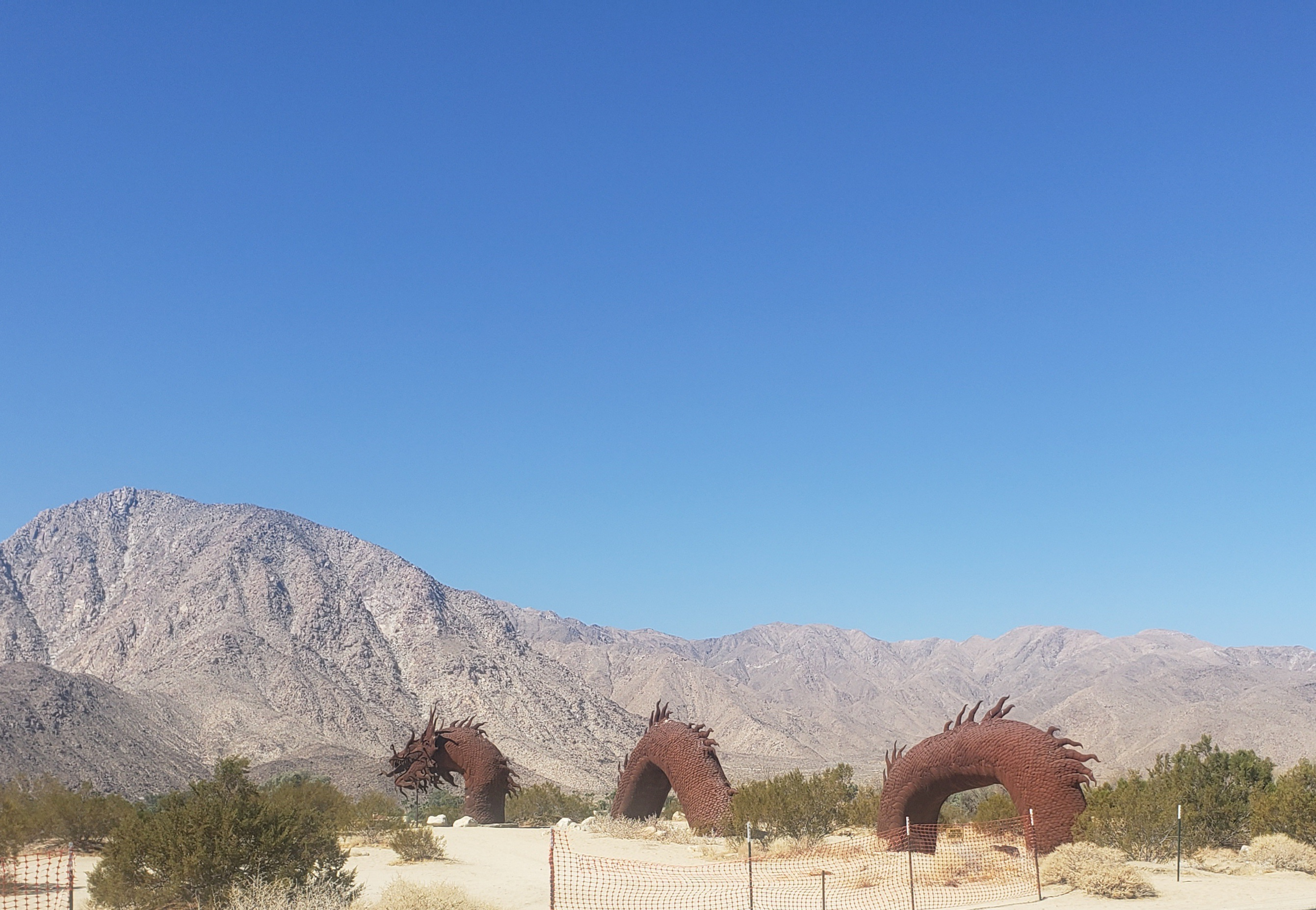
Sea serpent sculpture by Ricardo Breceda in Borrego Springs, CA

== Government ==
In the California State Legislature, Borrego Springs is in the 32nd senatorial district, represented by Republican Kelly Seyarto, and in the 75th Assembly district, represented by Republican Carl DeMaio.

In the United States House of Representatives, Borrego Springs is in California's 48th congressional district, represented by Republican Darrell Issa.

== Infrastructure ==
From the 1960s through the 1990s, Borrego Springs Airlines and its subsequent iterations provided commercial airline service to and from Borrego Valley Airport.

== In popular culture ==
The community and surrounding valley are significant sites in some of Dean Koontz's Jane Hawk novels.
