= Sunbelt Publications =

American publishing company

- Founded: 1988
- Founder: Diana Lindsay
- Country of origin: United States
- Headquarters location: El Cajon, California
- Publication types: Books, maps
- Official website: www.sunbeltbook.com

Sunbelt Publications is an American publication company that was incorporated in 1988. The company publishes and distributes multi-language pictorials, natural science and outdoor guidebooks, and regional references. The company is located in El Cajon, California.

== History ==
Diana and Lowell Lindsay founded Sunbelt Books with the goal of publishing books about the natural world. The Anza-Borrego Desert was the subject for Diana Lindsay's master's thesis, and she subsequently published it as a book entitled Our Historic Desert (1973) through Copley Books.

== Awards ==
- Courage to Heal – Theodor S. Geisel Award 2007, San Diego Book Awards
- Courage to Heal – Historical Fiction, 2007 San Diego Book Awards
- Palm Springs Legends: Creation of a Desert Oasis – 2012 Craft Awards, Outdoor Writers Association of California
