= Diana Lindsay =

- Born: July 14, 1944 (age 82); Winnipeg, Manitoba, Canada
- Citizenship: United States
- Education: MA in History and Geography
- Alma mater: San Diego State University
- Occupations: Author, Publisher, President of Sunbelt Publications
- Spouse: Lowell Lindsay
- Children: 2
- Writing career
- Genre: Non-fiction
- Notable works: Ricardo Breceda, Accidental Artist; Anza-Borrego A to Z

Diana Lindsay (born 1944) is the founder and president of Sunbelt Publications, an independent publishing house that focuses on natural science, historical and cultural interests, and the San Diego region. She is also an author and photographer and has been writing about the Anza-Borrego region since the 1960s.

== Early life and education ==
Lindsay was born in Winnipeg, Manitoba, Canada. Her family moved to Los Angeles a year later. She has a MA in history and geography from San Diego State University. She also attended UCLA. Her master's thesis was titled, "Our historic desert: the story of the Anza-Borrego desert," and was published in 1973 by Copley Books.

== Career ==
Lindsay lived in Amarillo, Texas for several years, where she became a columnist for a tri-state newspaper. After returning to San Diego, she worked as a marketing manager for a YMCA, and then as the sales manager for Copley Books, a division of the Union-Tribune publishing company.

Lindsay's second book was co-authored with her husband and titled "The Anza-Borrego desert region: A guide to the state park." It was published in 1978 by Wilderness Press, and is now in its fifth edition.

After the Lindsays had difficulty getting their books distributed to stores, they started their own publishing company, focusing on the distribution element instead of depending on others to distribute their books for them.

Sunbelt Publications was launched in 1985, combining book publishing with distribution and book wholesaling. For a time, it was the largest regional book wholesaler in the Southwest. Since then, with the closure of many bookstore outlets, Sunbelt has shifted its emphasis to regional and custom publishing.

Lindsay won the Outdoor Writers Association of California (OWAC) "Outdoor Writer of the Year" and "Best Outdoor Book of the Year" for 2013.

== Personal life ==
Lindsay married Lowell Lindsay in 1964. She is a former president of the Anza-Borrego Foundation, where she served thirty years as a trustee. In March 2013, she was presented with The Medallion Award, California State Park's highest honor for superior achievement. She is currently a board member of the San Diego Natural History Museum.

== Published works ==
- Our Historic Desert, 1973
- The Southern Overland Route, 1985 (co-author)
- Southwest America Bicycle Route, 1987 (co-author)
- Anza-Borrego A to Z: People, Places and Things, 2000
- Jackpot Trail: Indian Gaming in Southern California, 2003 (co-author)
- Marshal South and the Ghost Mountain Chronicles: An Experiment in Primitive Living, 2005 (editor and foreword)
- Anza-Borrego Desert Map' 3rd ed., 2006 (co-author)
- Anza-Borrego Desert Region: A Guide To State Park And Adjacent Areas of the Western Colorado Desert; 5th ed., 2006 (co-author)
- Ricardo Breceda: Accidental Artist, 2012
- Sky Art Metal Sculptures Pocket Guide; 2nd ed., 2012
- Anza-Borrego: A Photographic Journey, 2013 (foreword)
- Marshal South Rides Again: His Anza-Borrego Novels, 2013 (editor and foreword)
- Metal Sculptures of Borrego Valley: Featuring the Artistry of Ricardo Breceda, 2013
