= Moishe House =

Young adult Jewish community

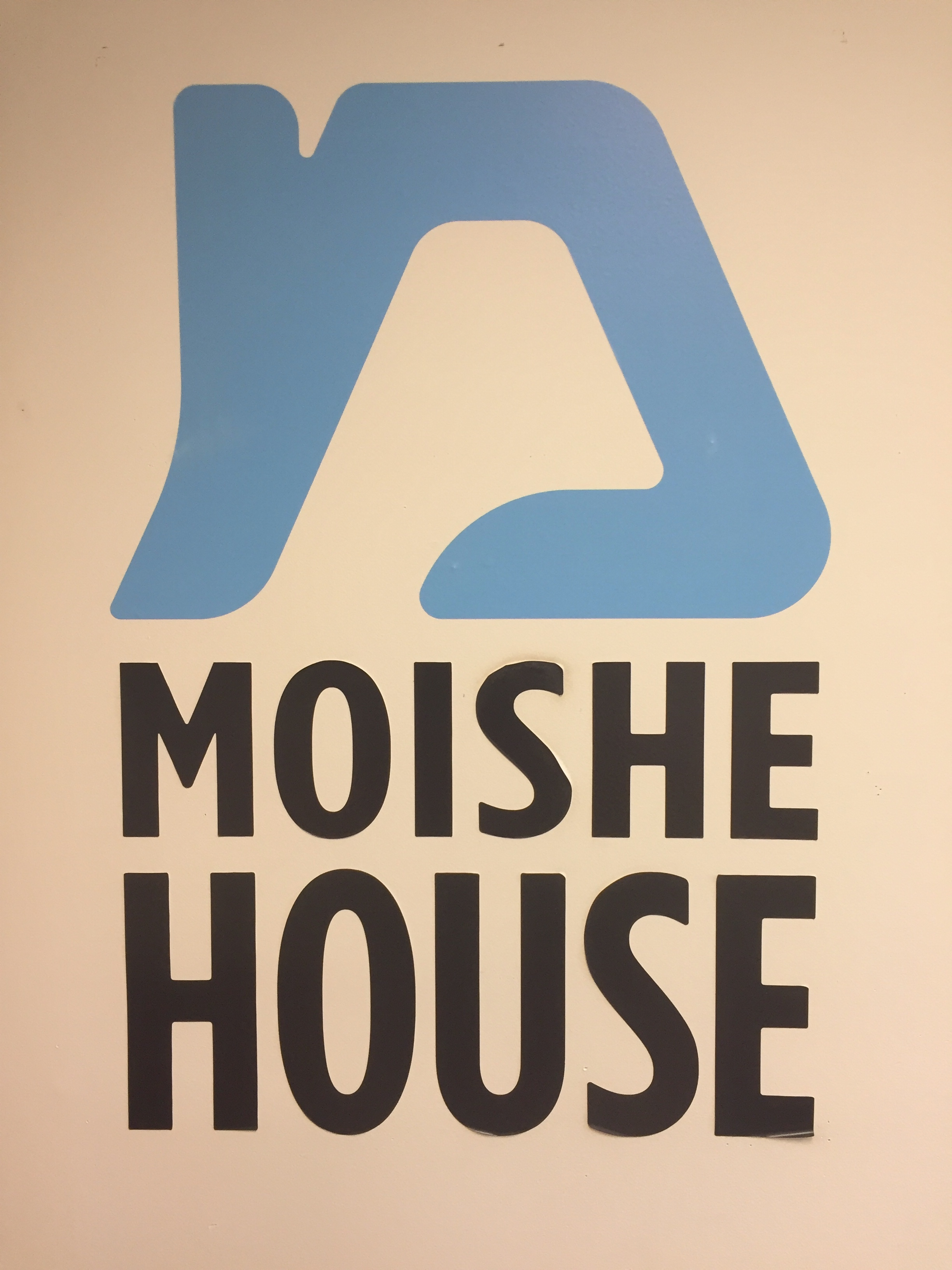
- Moishe House logo
- Formation: 2006; 20 years ago
- Founder: David Cygielman; Morris Bear Squire
- Headquarters: Encinitas, California, United States; Charlotte, North Carolina, United States; London, England
- CEO: David Cygielman
- Website: Moishe House

Moishe House is an international non-profit organization and Jewish outreach initiative. It is made up of a collection of homes throughout the world that serve as hubs for young adult Jewish community (with an emphasis on ages 21–32) founded by David Cygielman. It provides a rent subsidy and program budget to residents who then use their home to create Jewish communal space. It is pluralistic and open to Jews of all backgrounds and affiliations (reform, conservative, orthodox, secular etc.).

== Background and history ==
Moishe House was created in Oakland, CA in January 2006 by David Cygielman and American philanthropist Morris Bear Squire. Two weeks after opening its first house in Oakland, a second house opened in San Francisco.The idea for Moishe House came from observation that there was a lack of programming options for Jews who had graduated from college but had not yet settled down with a family. To fill this void, Moishe House developed a model for building peer-based Jewish communities and learning opportunities designed for Jews in their 20s.

From its inception until 2008, Moishe House was solely funded by Squire. In 2008, when Squire could no longer support the organization on his own, Moishe House secured non-profit 501(c)(3) charity tax status and the organization was then able to start receiving tax-deductible donations and grants. Jewish philanthropies such as Charles and Lynn Schusterman Family Philanthropies have made sizeable donations to the group. It is also supported by the Jim Joseph Foundation.

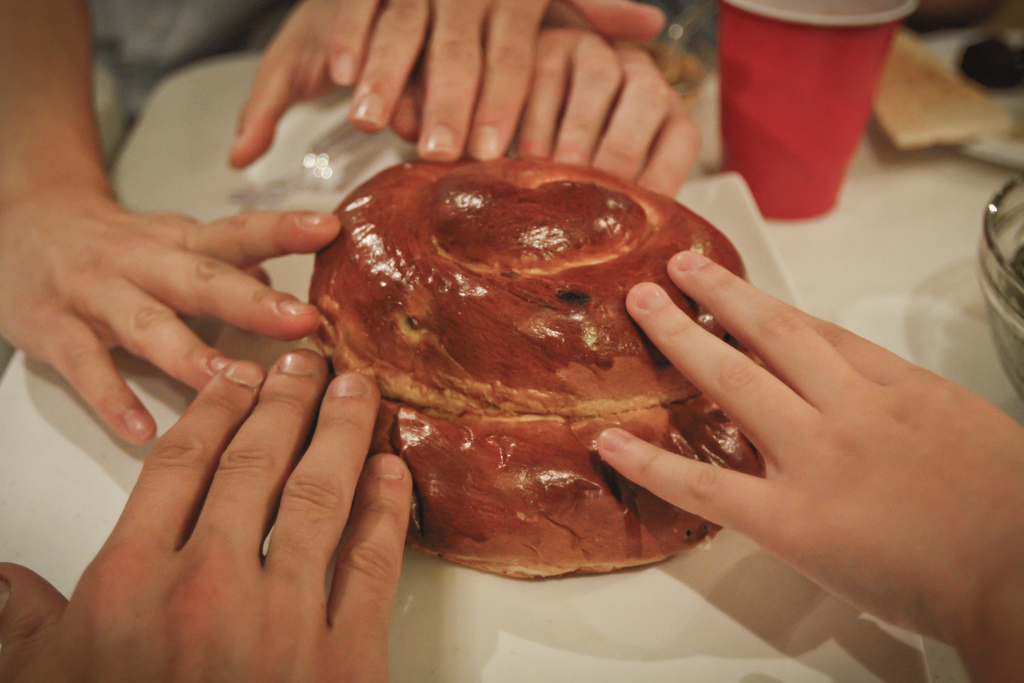
Challah at a Moishe House Shabbat

In 2010, Moishe House began working with Birthright NEXT over Shabbat programming. According to Cygielman, the partnership is natural, given the high participation rate of Moishe House residents on Birthright trips.

In 2017, it opened a house in Crown Heights, primarily for "Off the derech" individuals that have left Hasidic communities. In the same year, it started Camp Nai Nai Nai, a Jewish summer camp for adults in their 20s and 30s.

In 2022, amid the Russo-Ukrainian War, the Moishe House in Kyiv, Ukraine responded to the realities of the war by welcoming displaced persons. As violence surged in Kharkiv, the local Moishe House was forced to close; in response, a pod opened in Chernivtsi. Ukrainian Moishe House communities in Kyiv, Dnipro, and Odesa chose to remain open and pivoted to provide community services including food and medical supply distribution alongside their regular programming.

== The concept ==
Three to five young adults turn their home into a Moishe House with the financial assistance and guidance of the organization. In exchange for a rent subsidy, the residents agree to host a specific number of programs per month (typically 5-7) such as holiday celebrations, community service and social events. Moishe House aims to promote new Jewish leadership by providing young adults the opportunity to create and develop their own communities. Moishe House focuses on creating community for Jewish young adults by allowing residents to design and lead programs and activities that they deem relevant and interesting, without regard to a specific branch of Judaism. These programs include Shabbat dinners, social action activities, and social events.

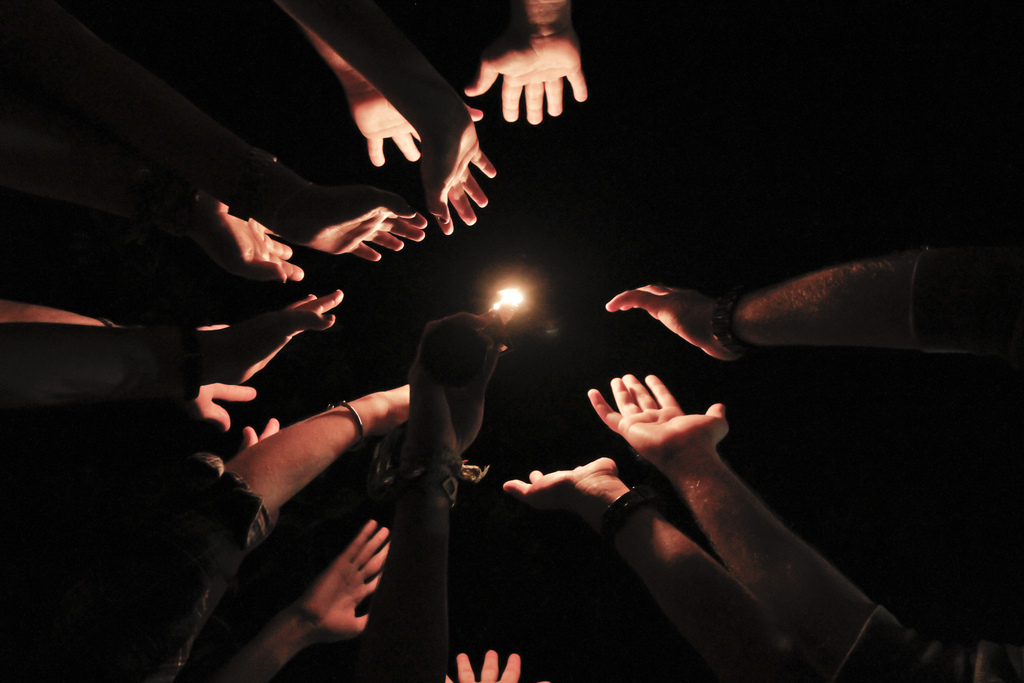
A Moishe House Havdallah

== Impact ==
The results of a two-year comprehensive evaluation conducted by The TCC Group and sponsored by the Jim Joseph Foundation found that Moishe House's model is having a profound impact on Jewish young adults internationally. The evaluation focused on both Moishe House residents’ and participants’ perceptions and opinions prior to becoming involved with Moishe House and since becoming involved. The percentage of participants who reported being aware of local opportunities for Jewish young adults to participate in fun and meaningful activities nearly doubled since becoming involved with Moishe House, while residents overwhelmingly noted that they have gained knowledge and skills related to Jewish traditions and customs. Moreover, residents’ affirmative responses more than tripled when asked if they consider themselves to be leaders in their Jewish community since becoming active in Moishe House. Both residents and participants feel more strongly about leading an active Jewish life since becoming involved with Moishe House.

Moishe House also has an alumni program to keep former residents engaged in the Moishe House community.

== Growth ==
As of 2024, there are more than 140 Moishe Houses and pods in over 30 countries, with 2023 seeing a 20 percent increase in the number of young people engaged in their activities. The organization collectively reaches approximately 45,000 unique young adults annually. Administratively, there are 50+ staff members around the world and three central offices.. Administratively, there are 50+ staff members around the world and three central Moishe House offices:

- Headquarters in Encinitas, California, United States
- East Coast Office in Charlotte, North Carolina, United States
- Moishe House Europe office in London, England

US cities with at least one Moishe House include:

- Arlington
- Atlanta
- Austin
- Baltimore
- Berkeley
- Bethesda
- Boston
- Boulder
- Charlotte
- Chicago
- Cincinnati
- Cleveland
- Columbus
- Dallas
- Denver
- Detroit
- Fort Lauderdale
- Hoboken
- Houston
- Kansas City, Kansas
- Los Angeles
- Miami
- Minneapolis
- Montclair
- New Orleans
- New York City
- Oakland
- Orange County
- Philadelphia
- Phoenix
- Pittsburgh
- Portland
- Raleigh-Durham
- San Diego
- San Francisco
- Seattle
- Silicon Valley
- South Palm Beach
- St. Louis
- Washington, D.C.

Internationally, there is a Moishe House in:

- Almaty, Kazakhstan
- Auckland, New Zealand
- Beersheba, Israel
- Beijing, China
- Brussels, Belgium
- Budapest, Hungary
- Buenos Aires, Argentina
- Cape Town, South Africa
- Chișinău, Moldova
- Dnipro, Ukraine
- Jerusalem, Israel
- Kazan, Russia
- Khabarovsk, Russia
- Kharkiv, Ukraine
- Kyiv, Ukraine
- London, United Kingdom
- Melbourne, Australia
- Minsk, Belarus
- Montevideo, Uruguay
- Montreal, Canada
- Moscow, Russia
- Munich, Germany
- Odesa, Ukraine
- Paris, France
- Perm, Russia
- Porto Alegre, Brazil
- Prague, Czech Republic
- Rio de Janeiro, Brazil
- Saint Petersburg, Russia
- Samara, Russia
- São Paulo, Brazil
- Shanghai, China
- Sofia, Bulgaria
- Stockholm, Sweden
- Sydney, Australia
- Tel Aviv, Israel
- Toronto, Canada
