= Morris Bear Squire =

Morris Bear Squire (November 5, 1923 – March 2014) was an American psychologist and hospital administrator who was known for his philanthropy and for a Medicare fraud case brought against him by the U.S. attorney's office in 1996 that involved a psychiatric hospital owned by Squire and administered by his son, Ari Squire. Morris Squire was the former owner and CEO of a national chain of 26 medical care facilities. He also founded several charitable organizations including the Forest Foundation, Moishe House and the Morris B. Squire Art Foundation. Squire's philanthropic endeavors were focused particularly on supporting Jewish causes.

Morris Bear Squire was born on November 5, 1923, in Chicago, Illinois, the son of Ukrainian immigrants. His father was a dentist and his mother was a pharmacist. Squire earned degrees in psychology from the University of Illinois and University of Chicago. In 1958, Squire purchased a Chicago psychiatric hospital and then administrated it. During the subsequent years, Squire purchased and administrated 25 more psychiatric treatment facilities.

In 1963, Squire established the Forest Foundation, a non-profit organization for funding psychology research. After retiring as chief executive officer and selling his corporation, Squire co-founded Moishe House, an international non-profit organization based in Oakland, California that supports and sponsors young Jewish leaders as they create communities for peers from their homes.

== Medicare fraud settlement ==
Squire was the owner of Forest Hospital in Des Plaines, Illinois in 1996 when the psychiatric hospital was accused by two former employees of Medicare fraud. The employees said that elderly residents of area nursing homes and assisted-living facilities were bused to a psychiatric program run by Squire's company in Elgin, Illinois. There, they would play games or sleep for five or six hours and were provided little, if any, psychiatric medical care.

Forest Hospital paid $4 million to settle the civil Medicare fraud case. The payment was made when the hospital was sold in 1997.

== Personal life ==
Morry and his first wife had 4 children. Morry and his second wife was Eunice. They had theee children, including Ari Squire, who faked his own death in a murder-suicide, and at least ten grandchildren.

In 1999, Squire married Lei The Dei of Cambodia. They renewed their marriage in 2003 at the Western Wall in Jerusalem. Squire resided in Santa Barbara, California.

He died in March 2014.

== Publications ==
- Morris B Squire, (1970) Current administrative practices for psychiatric services, Springfield, Ill.:Thomas, OCLC 80733
- Morris B Squire; Chris E Stout; Douglas H Ruben, (1993), Current advances in inpatient psychiatric care : a handbook, Westport, Conn. : Greenwood Press ISBN 0-313-28046-0
