= Jules Blanchard =

French sculptor (1832–1916)

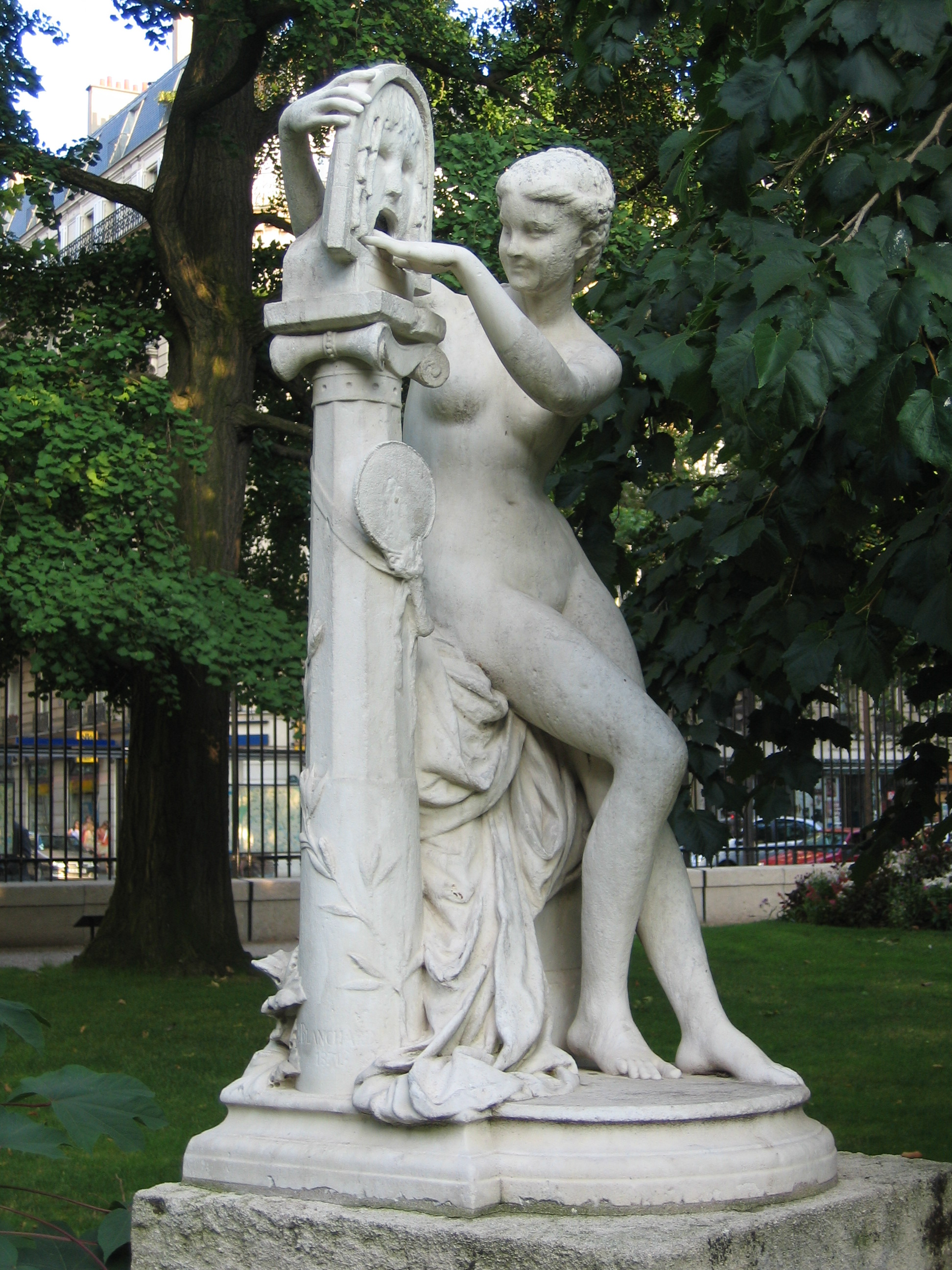
La Bocca della verità, by Jules Blanchard

Jules Blanchard (25 May 1832 – 2 May 1916) was a French sculptor.

Blanchard was born in Puiseaux. He was the son-in-law of sculptor Denis Foyatier. He was a student of François Jouffroy. Blanchard is perhaps best known for his renovation of the Fontaine du Palmier in the Place du Châtelet, Paris.

== Selected works ==
- La Bocca della verità (La bouche de la vérité) (1871), statue, marble, Paris, Jardin du Luxembourg
- Andromède (Salon de 1892), statue, Paris, Jardin du Luxembourg
- La Science (commande de 1882), statue, bronze, Paris, by the Hôtel de Ville, Paris
- Boccador, Paris, by the Hôtel de Ville
- Four caryatids, on the facade of the Hôtel de Ville
- Un jeune équilibriste (Salon de 1866), plaster
- Jeune Fille parlant au Sphinx, mairie de Puiseaux
