= Fountains in Paris =

Decorative features in Paris

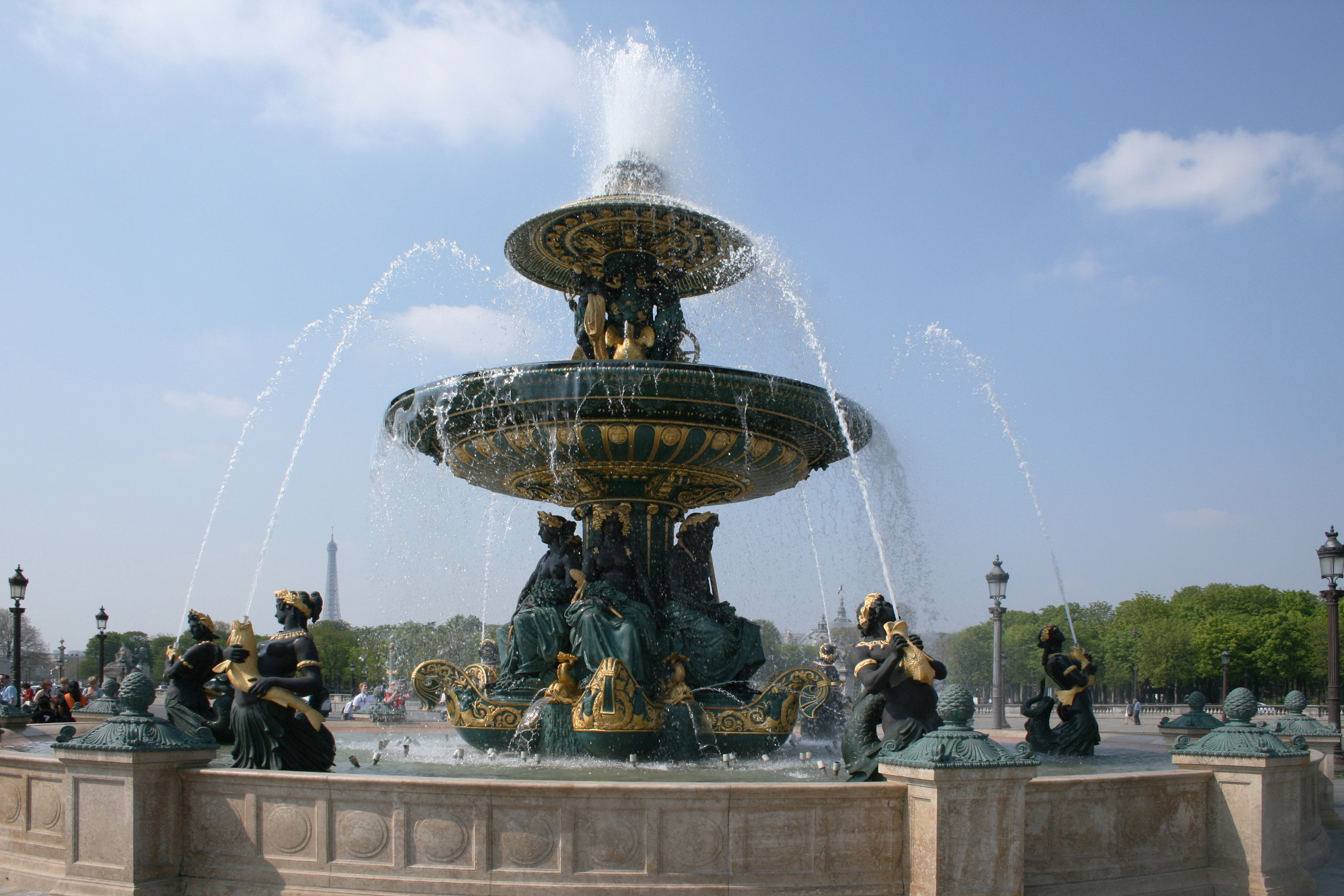
Fontaines de la Concorde (1836-1840)

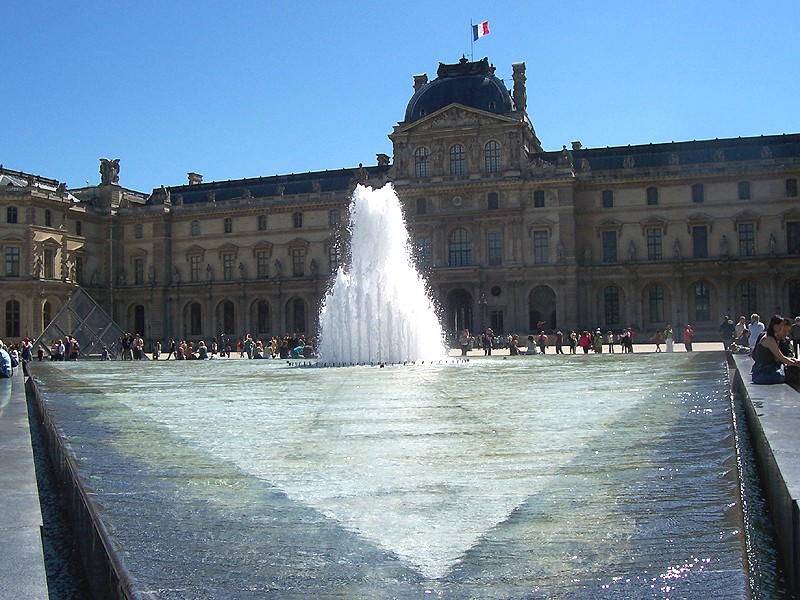
Fontaine de la Pyramide, Cour Napoleon I of the Louvre (1988)

The Fountains in Paris originally provided drinking water for city residents, and now are decorative features in the city's squares and parks. Paris has more than two hundred fountains, the oldest dating back to the 16th century. It also has more than one hundred Wallace drinking fountains. Most of the fountains are the property of the municipality.

In 2017, an investigation by the cultural heritage magazine La Tribune de l'art revealed that more than half of these fountains were not functioning.

For the list of Paris fountains by arrondissement, See List of Paris fountains.

== Paris Fountains of the 16th and 17th centuries ==
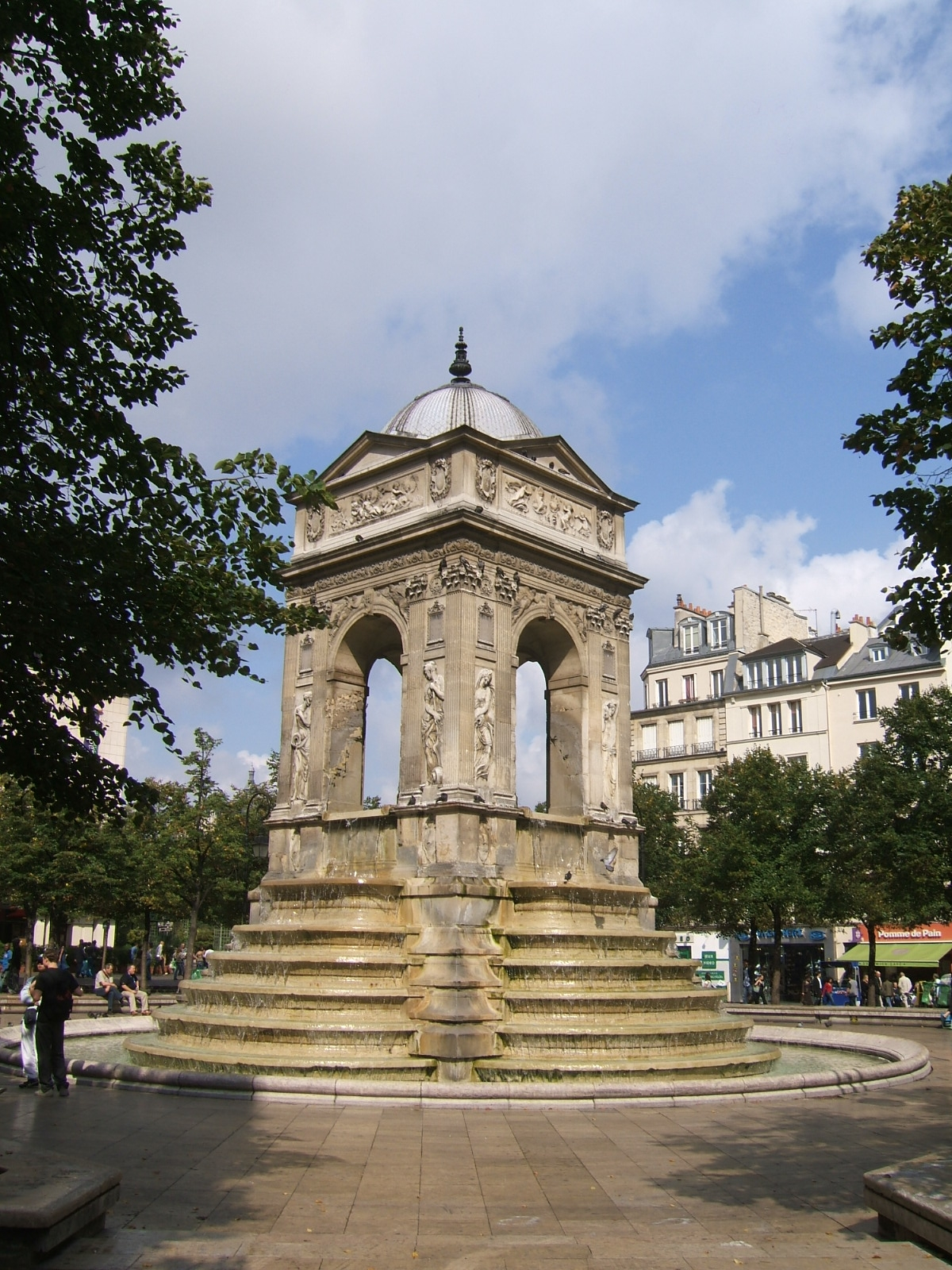
The Fontaine des Innocents in the 1st arrondissement as it looks today. It was moved in 1788 and made into free-standing fountain, and then moved again in 1858 to its present location in the middle of the Marché des Innocents.

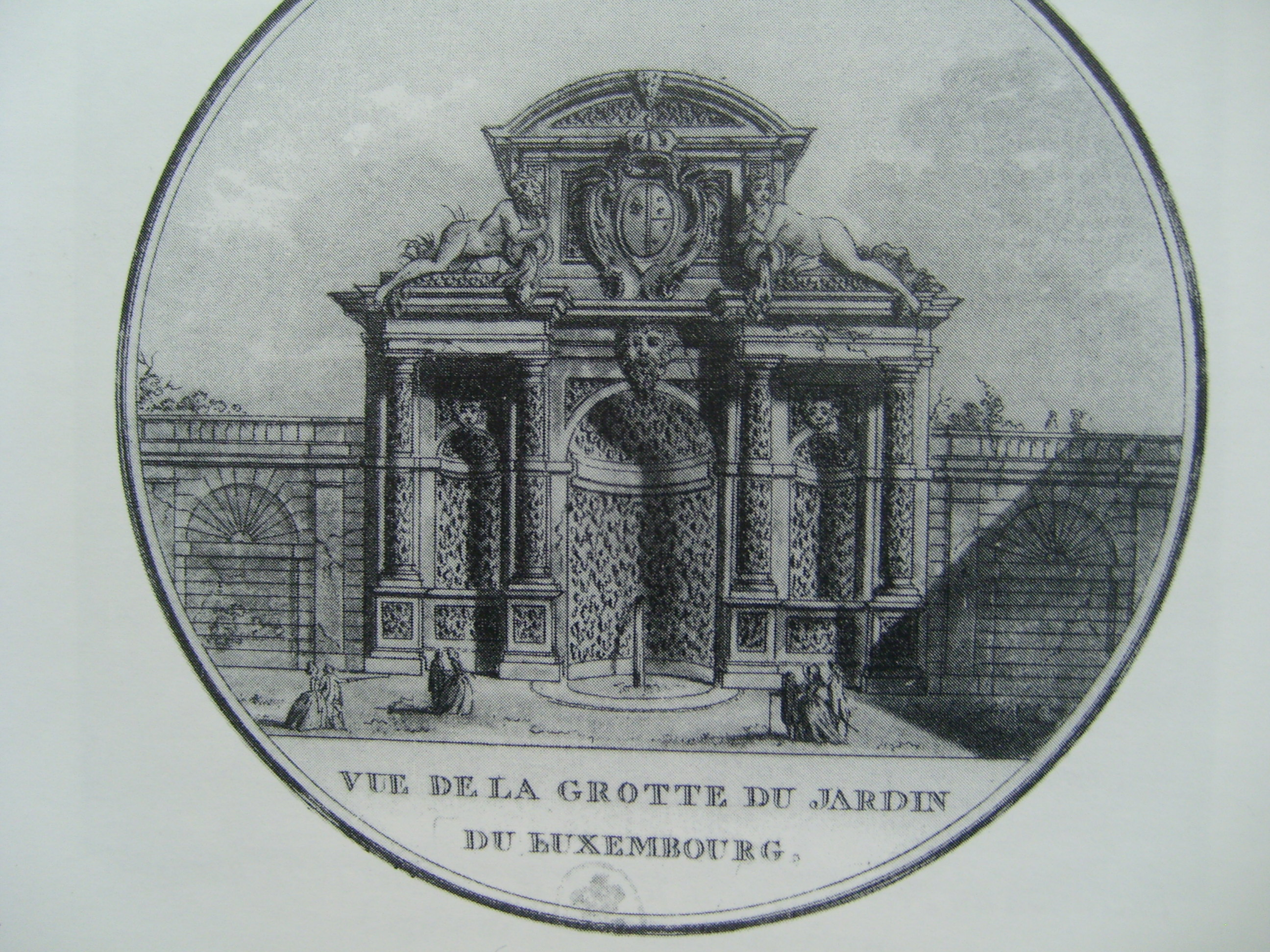
The Medici Fountain in the Jardin du Luxembourg (1630), was built for Marie de' Medici by Tommaso Francini, a Florentine fountain-maker brought to France by King Henry IV of France. (View of fountain about 1820, after additions by Chalgrin. Source: Bibliothèque Nationale de Paris)

The history of fountains in Paris until the mid-19th century was the history of the city's struggle to provide clean drinking water to its growing population. The building of fountains also depended upon the law of gravity; until the introduction of mechanical pumps, the source of the water had to be higher than the fountain for the water to flow.

In the third century BC, the original inhabitants, the Parisii, took their water directly from the River Seine. By the first century BC, the Roman engineers of the town of Lutetia had built the aqueduct of Arcueil using gravity to provide water for their baths and for their public fountains.

In the Middle Ages, the Roman aqueduct of Arcueil had fallen into ruins and residents once again took their water from the Seine or from wells. By the reign of Philip II of France (1180–1223), two large monasteries existed outside the city walls north of Paris; the Abbey of Saint-Laurent, at the foot of Montmartre, and the Abbey of Saint-Martin-des-Champs. These monasteries received fresh water from two aqueducts; the Abbey of Saint Laurent by lead pipes coming from the heights of Romaineville and Menilmontant, and the Abbey of Saint-Martin-des-Champs by a masonry aqueduct coming from the summit of Belleville. In the first half of the 13th century, these two aqueducts were used to supply water to the first recorded fountains in medieval Paris, the Fontaine des Halles, the Fontaine des Innocents, and the Fontaine de Maubuée. These fountains did not gush water; water poured out continually in thin streams from bronze masquerons, masks, usually of animals, into stone basins so local residents could fill their vessels with water.

By 1498, when Louis XII of France became King, the water supply of Paris was controlled jointly by the merchants of the city, led by the Prévot des Marchands, and the king. They decided how water would be distributed and were responsible for building public fountains. The water supply of Paris was still very limited; by the end of the 15th century, there were only seventeen fountains providing water in Paris, including five outside the walls. All of the fountains were on the Right Bank; the two aqueducts supplied water, and, as the water table was close to the surface, and it was easy to dig wells there, while on the Left Bank the water table was deep underground and there were no working aqueducts so almost all water had to be carried from the Seine. As a result, the Left Bank had hardly grown since the time of Philip II.

In the early 17th century, King Henry IV of France decided to bring water to the Left Bank for the university and for the planned Luxembourg Palace of his wife, Marie de' Medici. A new aqueduct was built between 1613 and 1623 to bring water from Rungis. This new aqueduct supplied six new fountains on the Left Bank, including the present-day Medici Fountain, and one on the Right Bank. In addition, five new fountains were built on the right bank using the two original aqueducts. Henry's brought Tommaso Francini, a Florentine fountain maker, to Paris, where he designed the Medici Fountain in the Jardin du Luxembourg. In 1636 he became the Intendant general des Eaux et Fontaines, in charge of all royal fountains and water projects. His descendants held this title until 1781.

Another major contribution of Henry IV was the construction between 1578 and 1608 of La Samaritaine, an enormous hydraulic water pump, powered by a water wheel under the Pont Neuf, which lifted water up from the Seine to a reservoir near Saint-Germain-l'Auxerois, for use in the Louvre Palace and the Tuileries Gardens. Two more pumps were added in 1673. Thanks to the pumps and the new aqueduct, by 1673 Paris, with an estimated population of 500,000 people, had 16 fountains on the Right bank fed by aqueducts, 14 fountains on the Left Bank fed by the new Aqueduct of Arcueil, and twenty one new fountains along the Right and Left banks of the river, fed by the new hydraulic pumps.

Of the fountains built in the 16th and 17th century, all were either rebuilt or demolished in the following two centuries. Only a few, such as the Fontaine Boucherat, the Fontaine des Innocents and Medici Fountain, all extensively rebuilt, still preserve the character of their time.

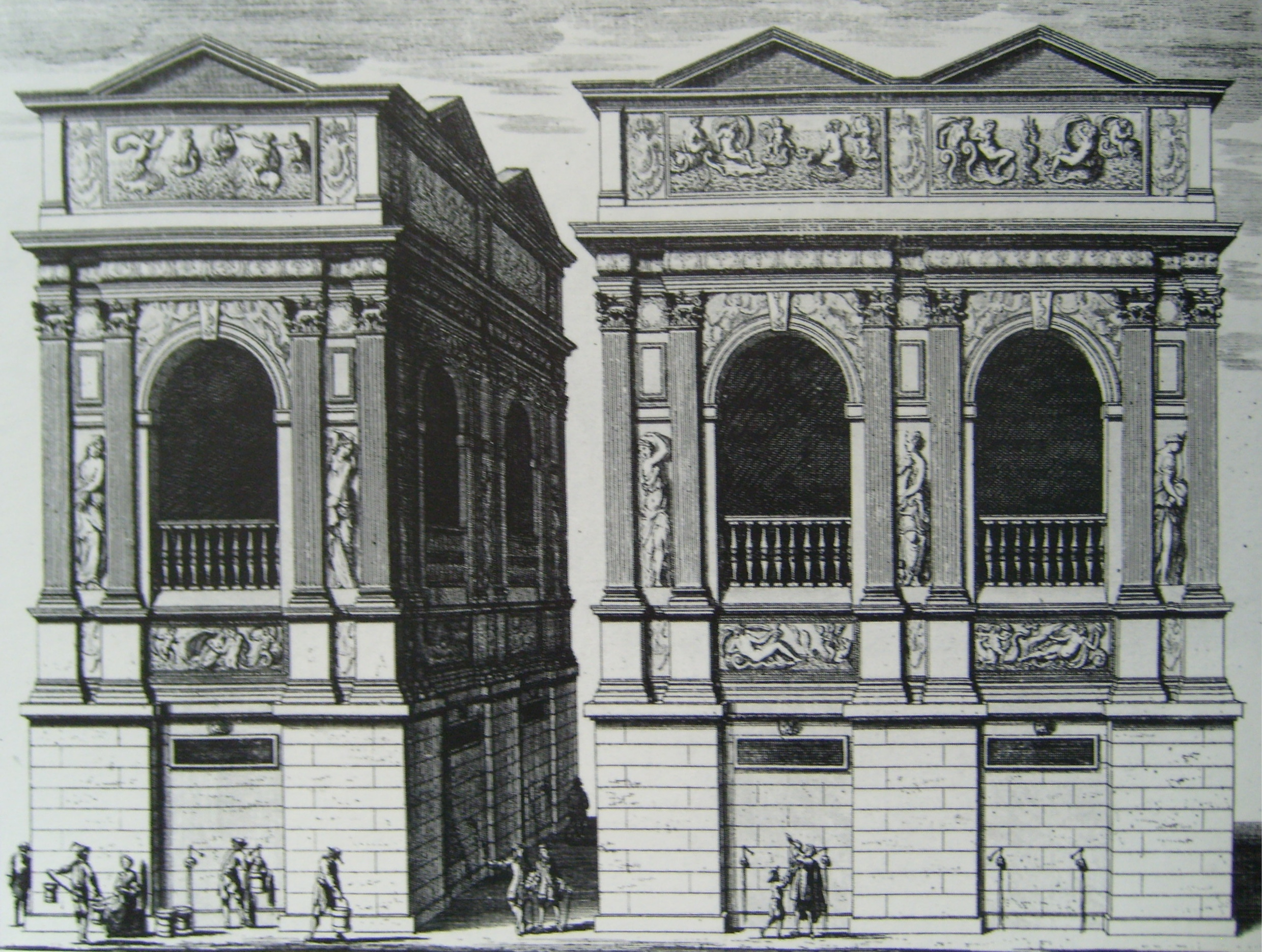
The Fontaine des Innocents was built in 1549 to welcome King Henry II on his solemn entry to Paris. Parisians could fill vessels with water from the ornamental spouts at street level. (17th-century engraving by Perelle.)

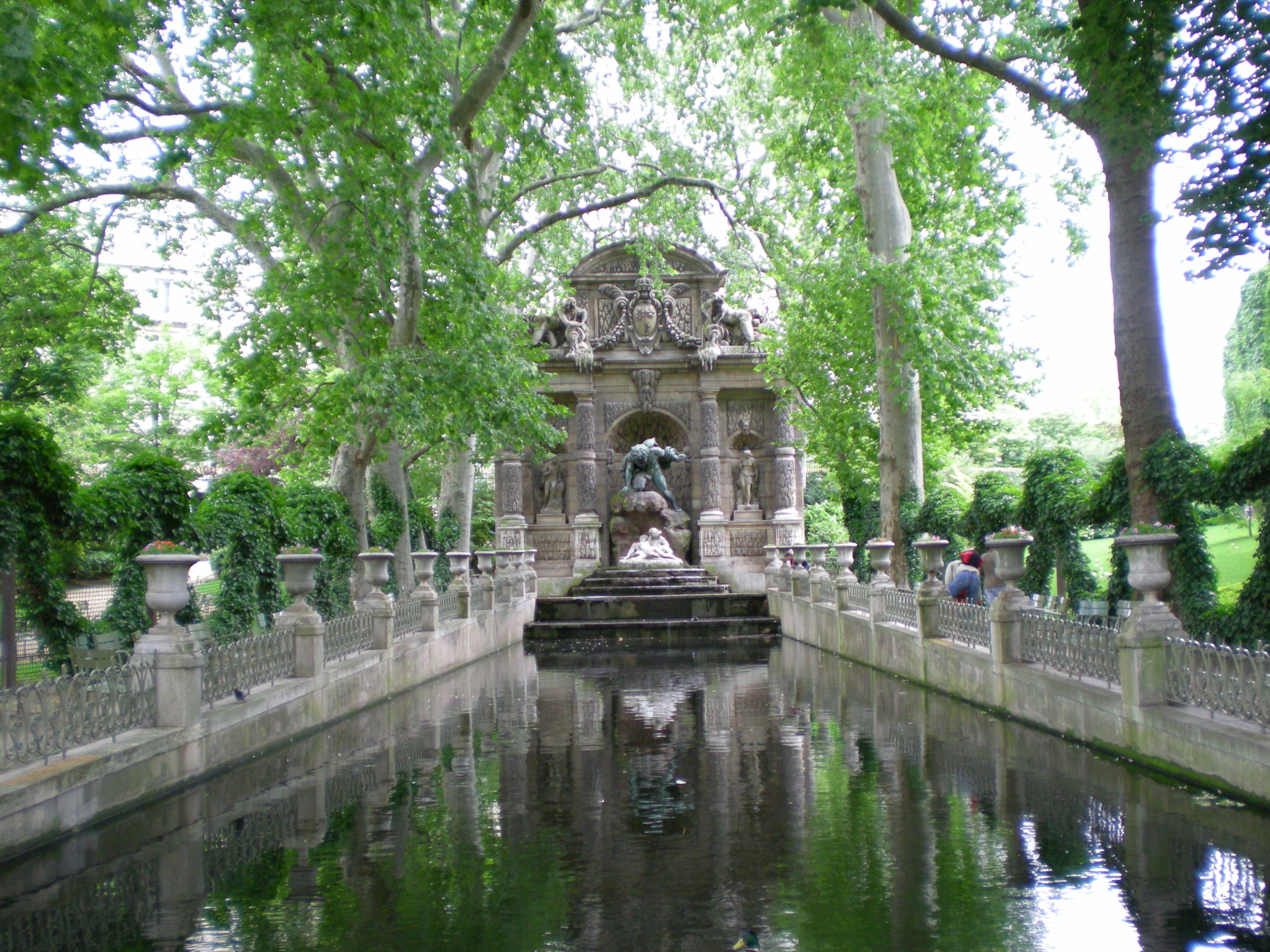
The Medici Fountain in the Jardin du Luxembourg (1630) as it looks today. The basin of water and group of sculptures were added in the nineteenth century.

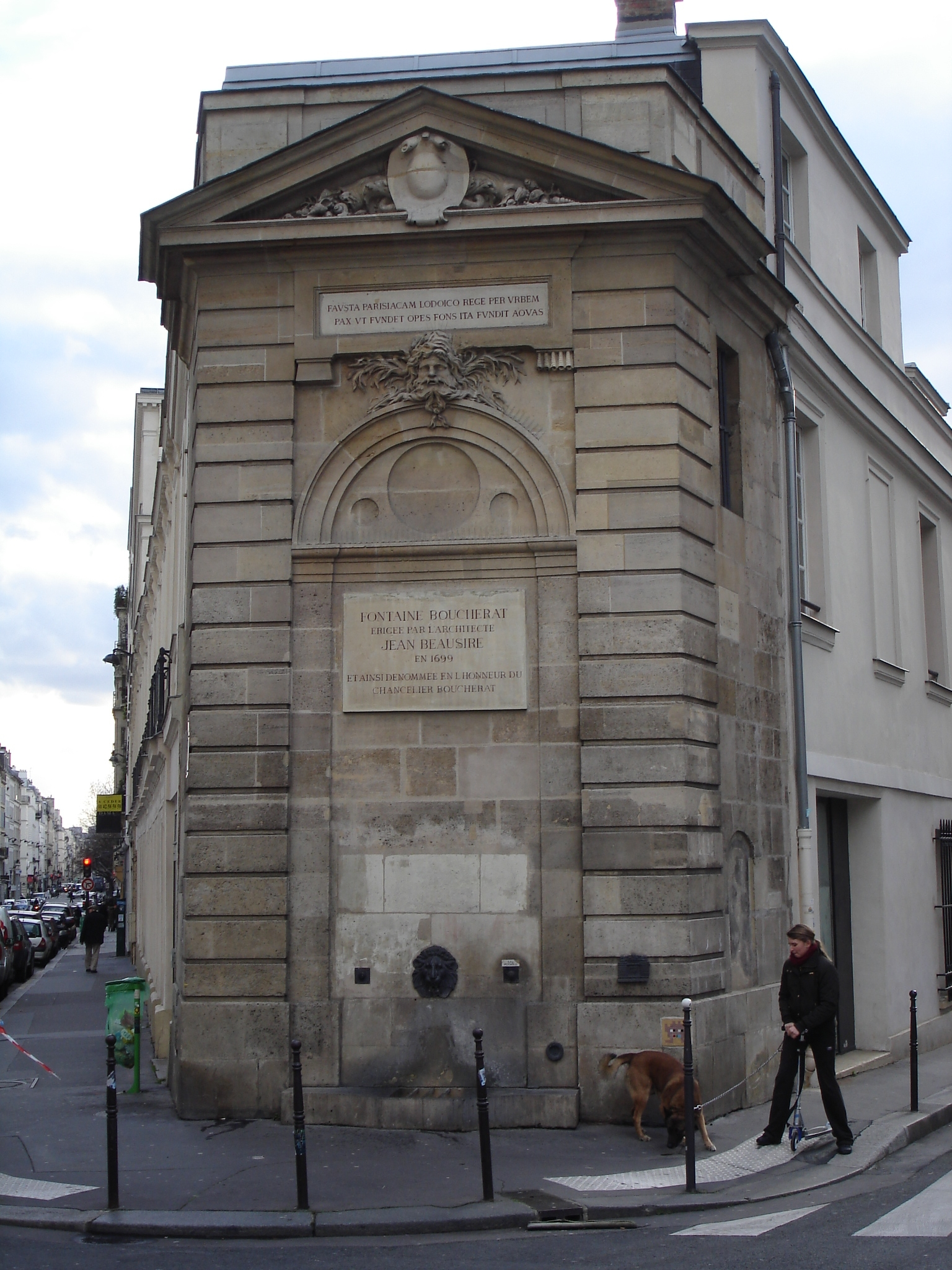
Fontaine Boucherat, Rue de Turenne, (1695-1699), represents the work of Jean Beausire, Director of Public Works in Paris for King Louis XIV.

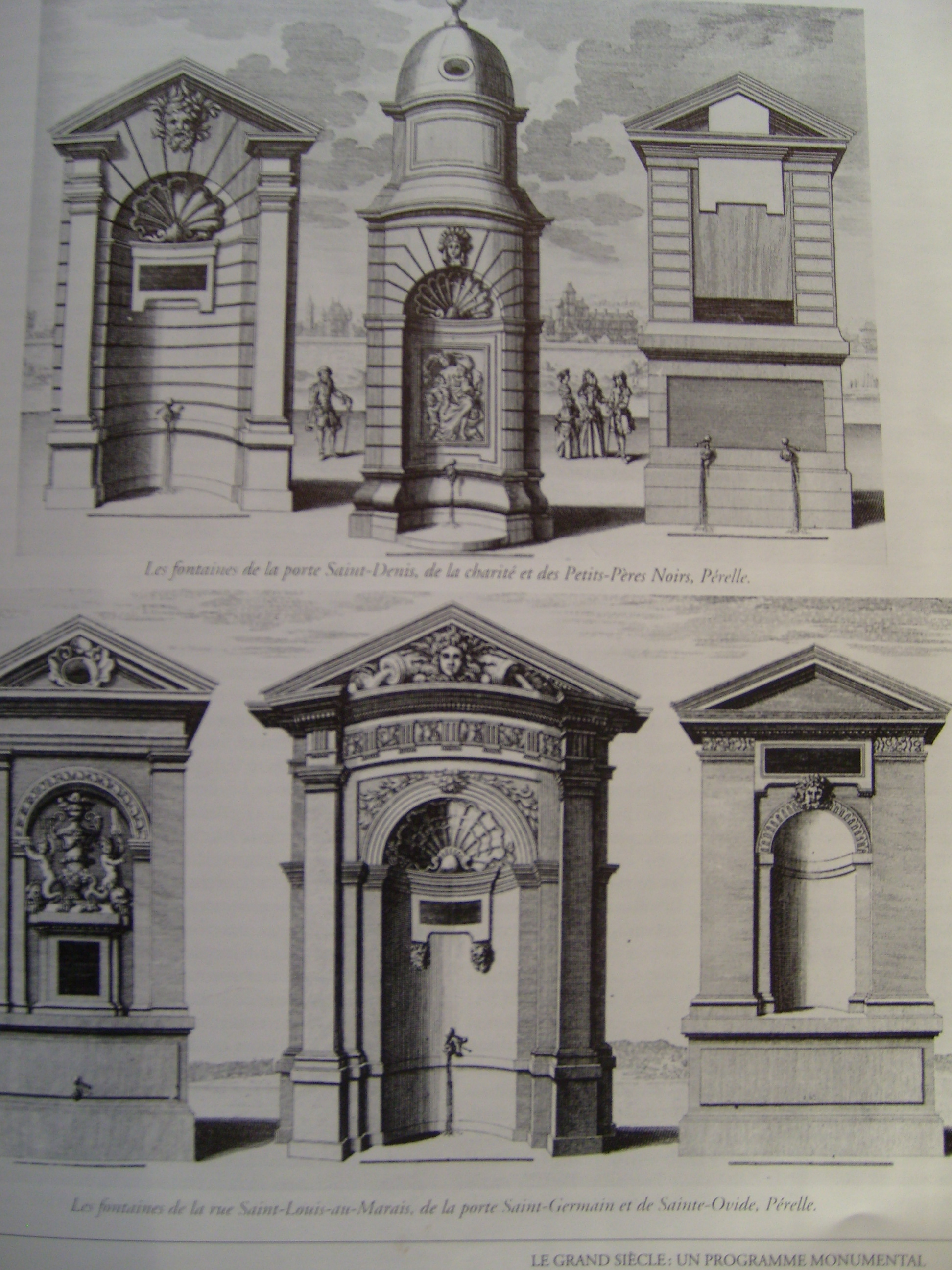
Six Paris fountains from about 1670; The fontaines of porte Saint-Denis, de la charité and des Petis-Peres Noirs (top); and rue Saint-Louis-au-Marais, porte Saint-Germain and Sainte-Ovide (bottom). (Bibloiotheque d'Art et d'Archeology, Paris)

== Paris Fountains of the 18th century ==
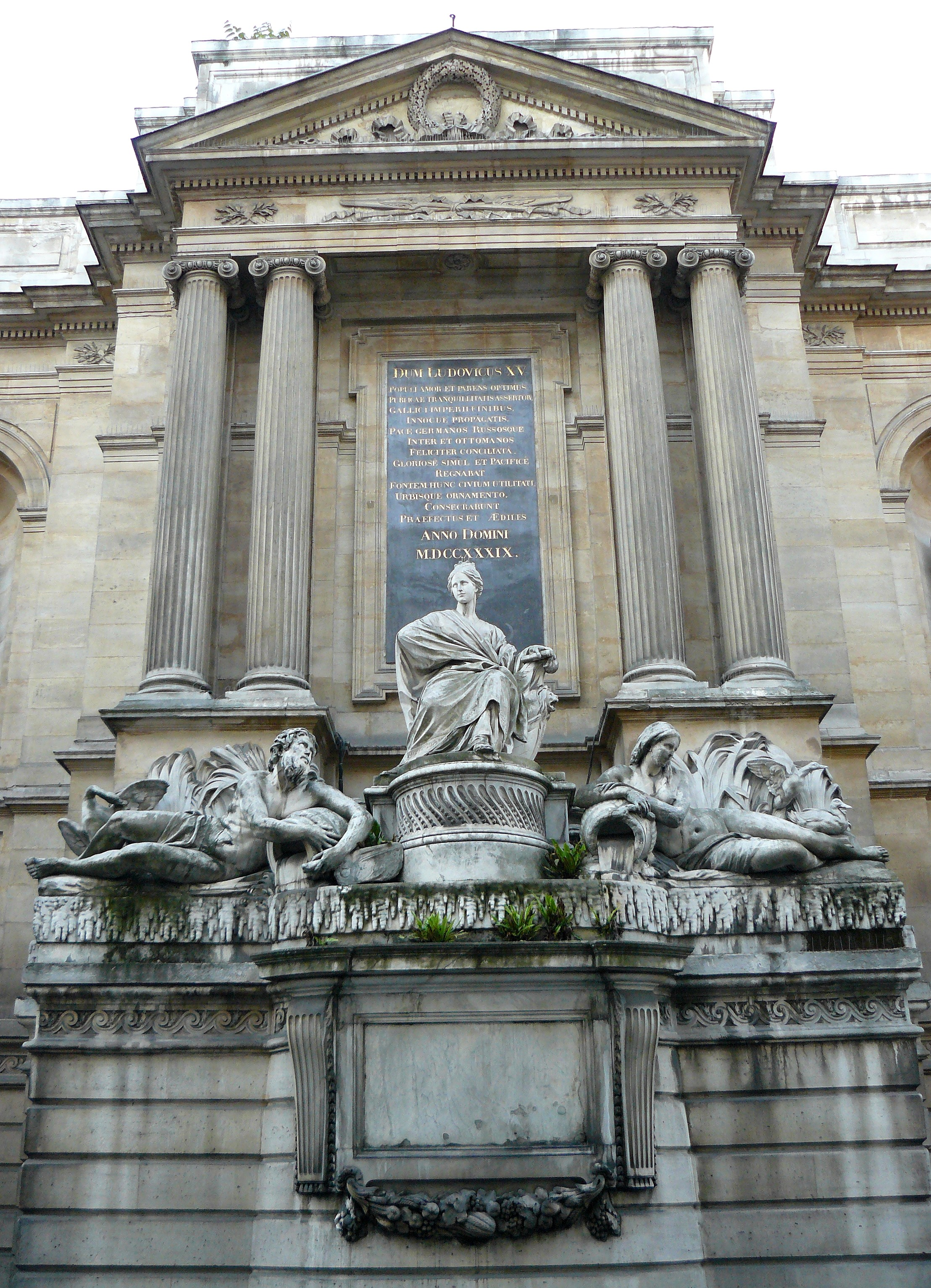
The massive Fontaine des Quatre-Saisons on the rue de Grenelle (7th arrondissement) (1739), by sculptor Edme Bouchardon, had a crowd of monumental statues but only two faucets, and irritated the philosopher Voltaire because of its large scale on the narrow street.

The eighteenth century saw the construction of thirty new fountains, of which fourteen still survive, and the building of three châteaux d'eau, water reservoirs located inside large structures. Many of these fountains were the work of Jean Beausire, who, by royal edict, was Contrôleur des bâtiments of the city of Paris between 1692 and 1740. His fountains were usually small, set against a wall, with a niche and a single spout pouring water into a small basin, but they were dignified and elegant, decorated with seashells, mythological figures, and sometimes had imitations of the calcified walls of grottos, imitating natural springs.

In the middle of the 18th century Voltaire and other critics began to demand more open squares and more ornamental fountains. In Les Embellisements de Paris, written in 1749, Voltaire wrote, "We have only two fountains in good taste, and they should certainly be better placed. All the others are worthy of a village." The government responded to these demands for grander fountains by commissioning the Fontaine des Quatre-Saisons (1739) and by an even grander project for a square with fountains, Place Louis XV, which became the Place de la Concorde.

Despite the new fountains, the city had problems supplying enough water to the growing population of the city. In 1776, a private water company, La Comagnie des Eaux de Paris, was started by two mechanical engineers, Jacques-Constantin and Augustin-Charles Périer. They promised to deliver water directly to anyone who could pay for it through a system of pipes directly to homes. They imitated the city of London and installed a steam-powered water pump at Chaillot in 1782. The first pumps, built in Birmingham, England, and named Constantine and Augustine, raised water from the Seine and filled four reservoirs near the hill of Chaillot, from which the water flowed downhill through iron pipes (also made in England) to their private subscribers, and also to seven new public fountains. In 1786, after the success of the first pumps, two new engines, Louise and Thérèse, were added along the quai d'Orsay and the Gros Caillou, which, beginning in 1788, pumped water to a 35-metre-high (115 ft) tower, which flowed down through pipes to the neighborhoods of les Invalides, Ecole Militaire, and the faubourg Saint-Germain.

The creation of the private water company created a bitter political struggle between those who supported the company, including the playwright Pierre Beaumarchais, the author of the Marriage of Figaro, who was one of the directors and became wealthy from the water company, and those who opposed it, including the guild of water-porters, whose jobs were threatened, led by the Comte de Mirabeau. In 1788, after a financial crisis, the company went bankrupt and passed into the hands of the Royal Treasury, but its technical success was proven; of the eighty-five fountains in Paris in 1807, 45 were fed with water from the company's steam pumps.

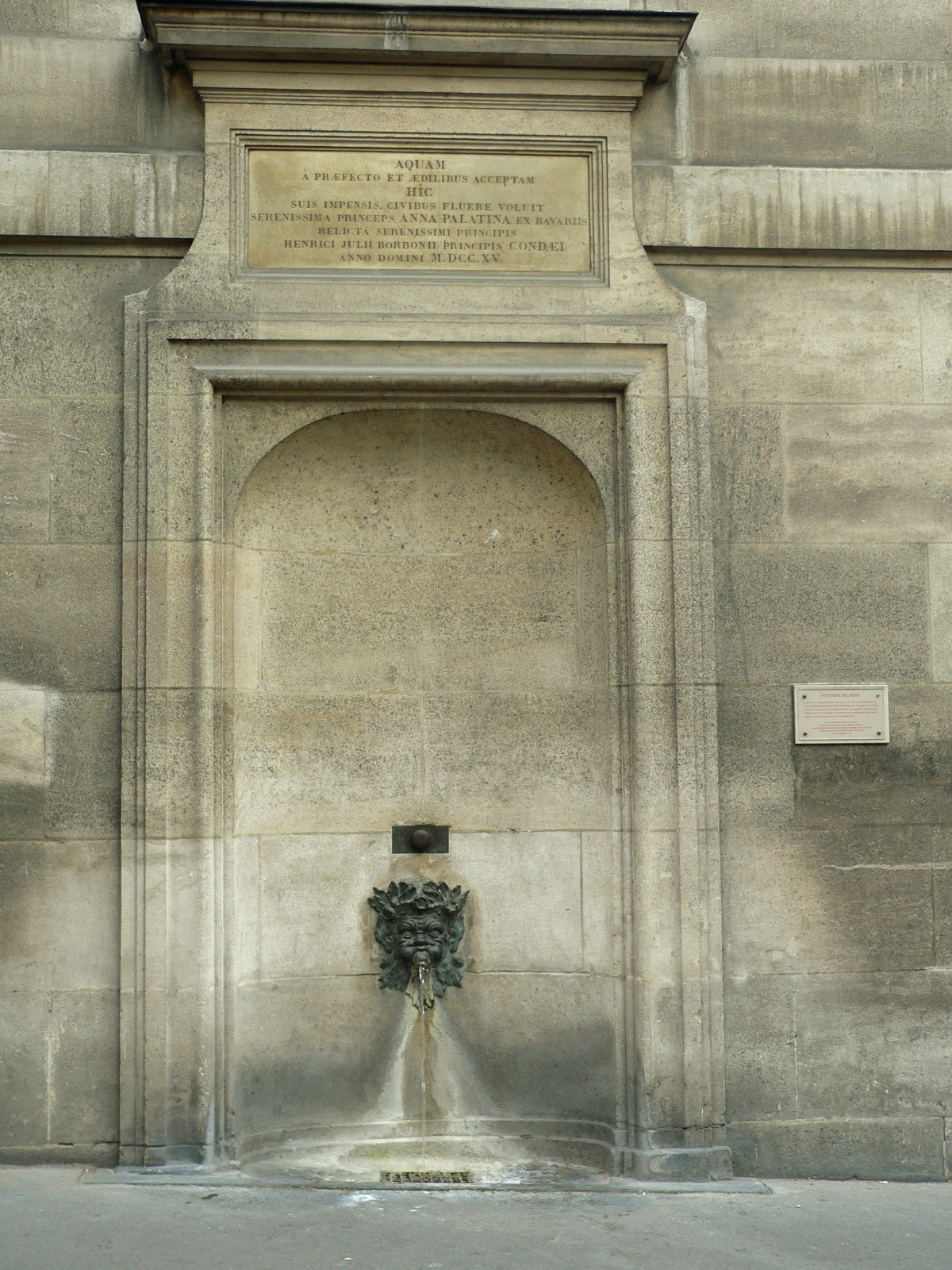
Fontaine Palatine, Rue Garanciére, 6th arrondissement. Built by Princess Anne Henriette of Bavaria in 1715. When her house was torn down in 1913, the fountain was rebuilt on the same site.

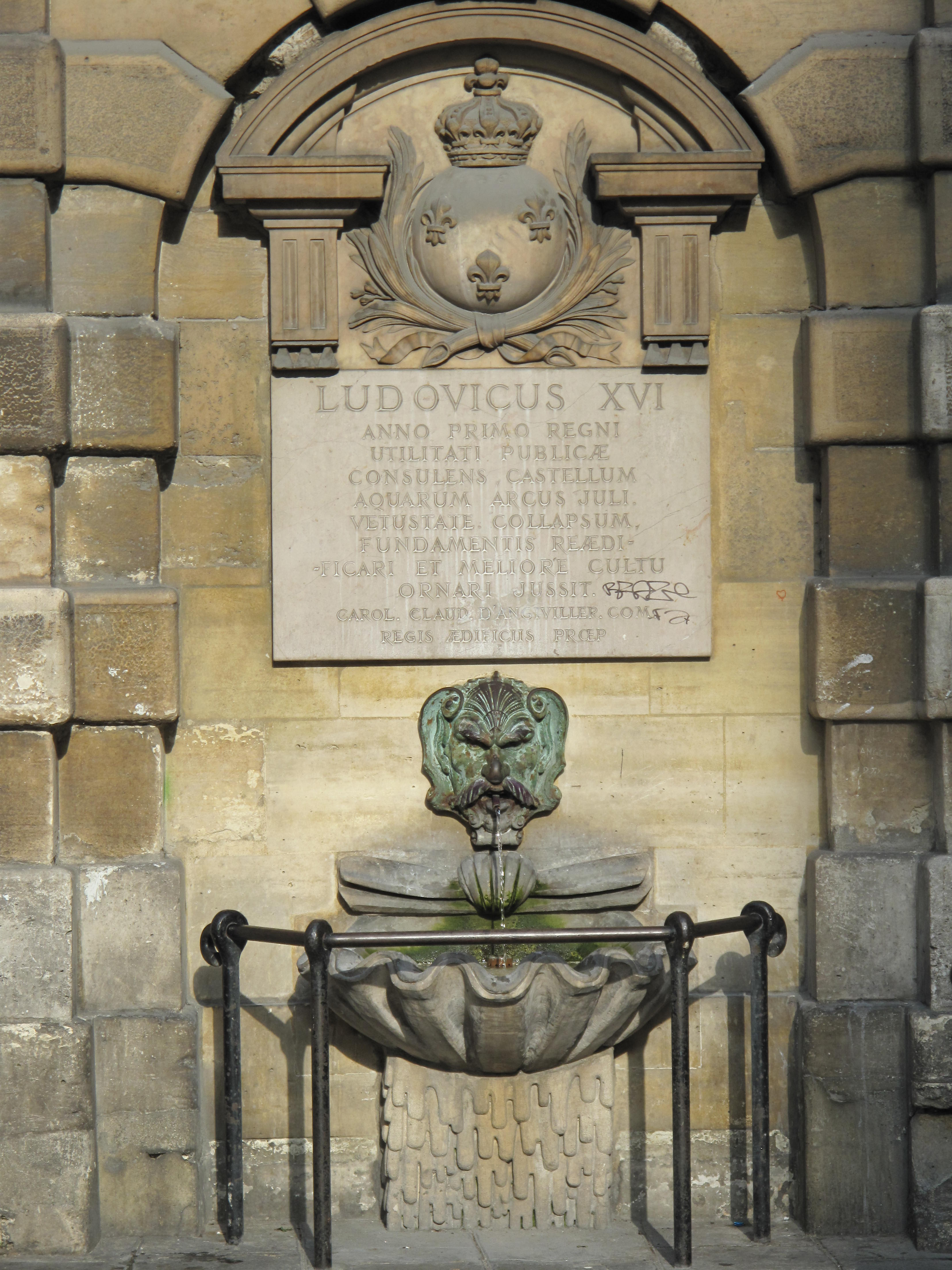
Château d'eau de la Croix du Trahoir, corner of rue de l'Arbre Sec and Rue Sain-Honoré (1st arrondissement) On the site of a 17th-century fountain, rebuilt in its present form in 1775 by Jacques-Germain Soufflot, architect of the Panthéon, Paris.

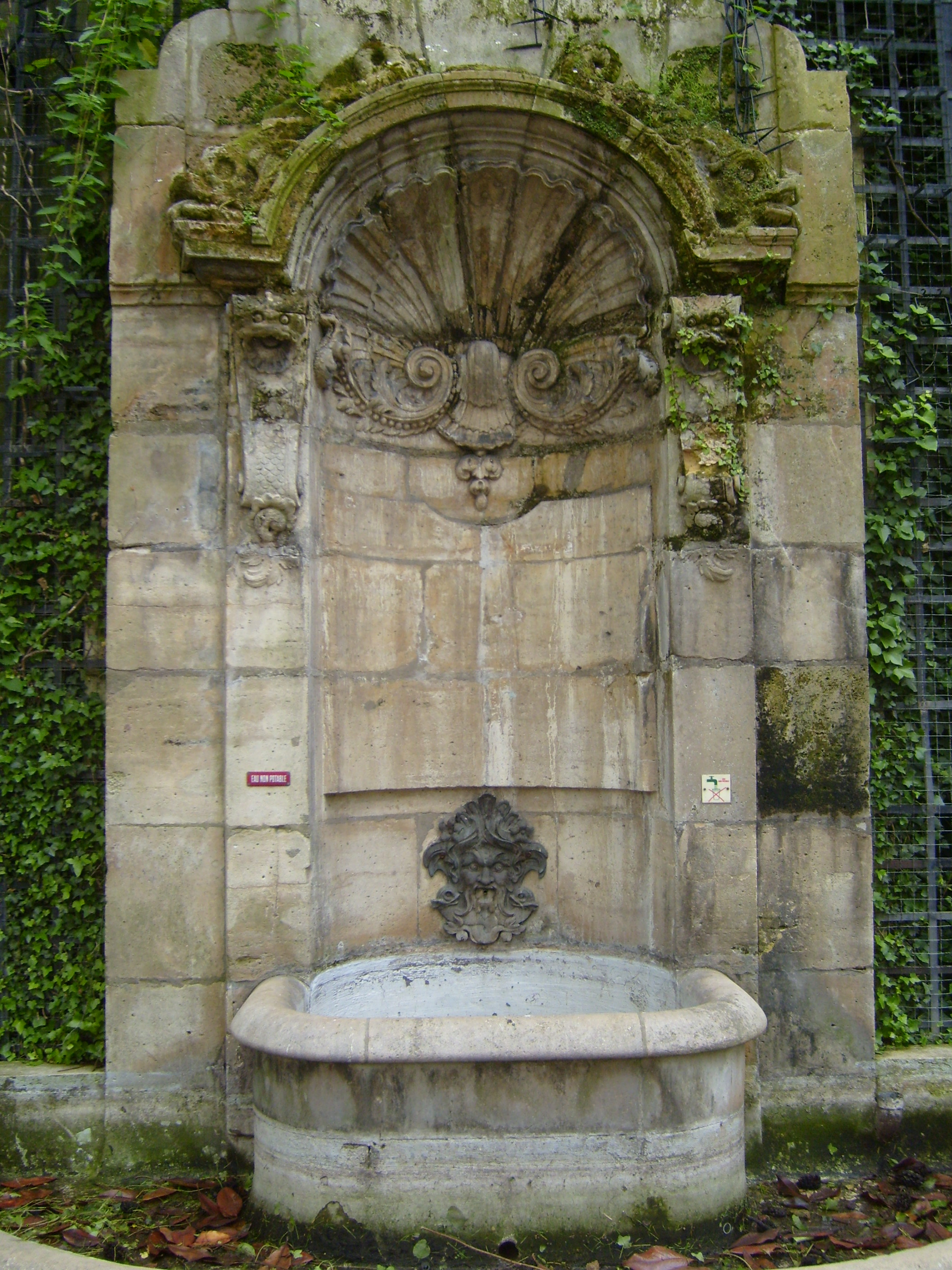
Fontaine de L'Abbaye de Saint-Germain-des-Pres, (1714-1717) built by Victor-Thierry Sully and Jean Beausire, near the church of Saint-Germain-des-Prés. originally at Rue Childebert and Rue Saint-Marguerite. It was moved in the 19th century to make room for the Boulevard Saint-Germain, and now is in Square Langevin, in the 5th arrondissement, against the wall of the former Ecole Polytechnique.

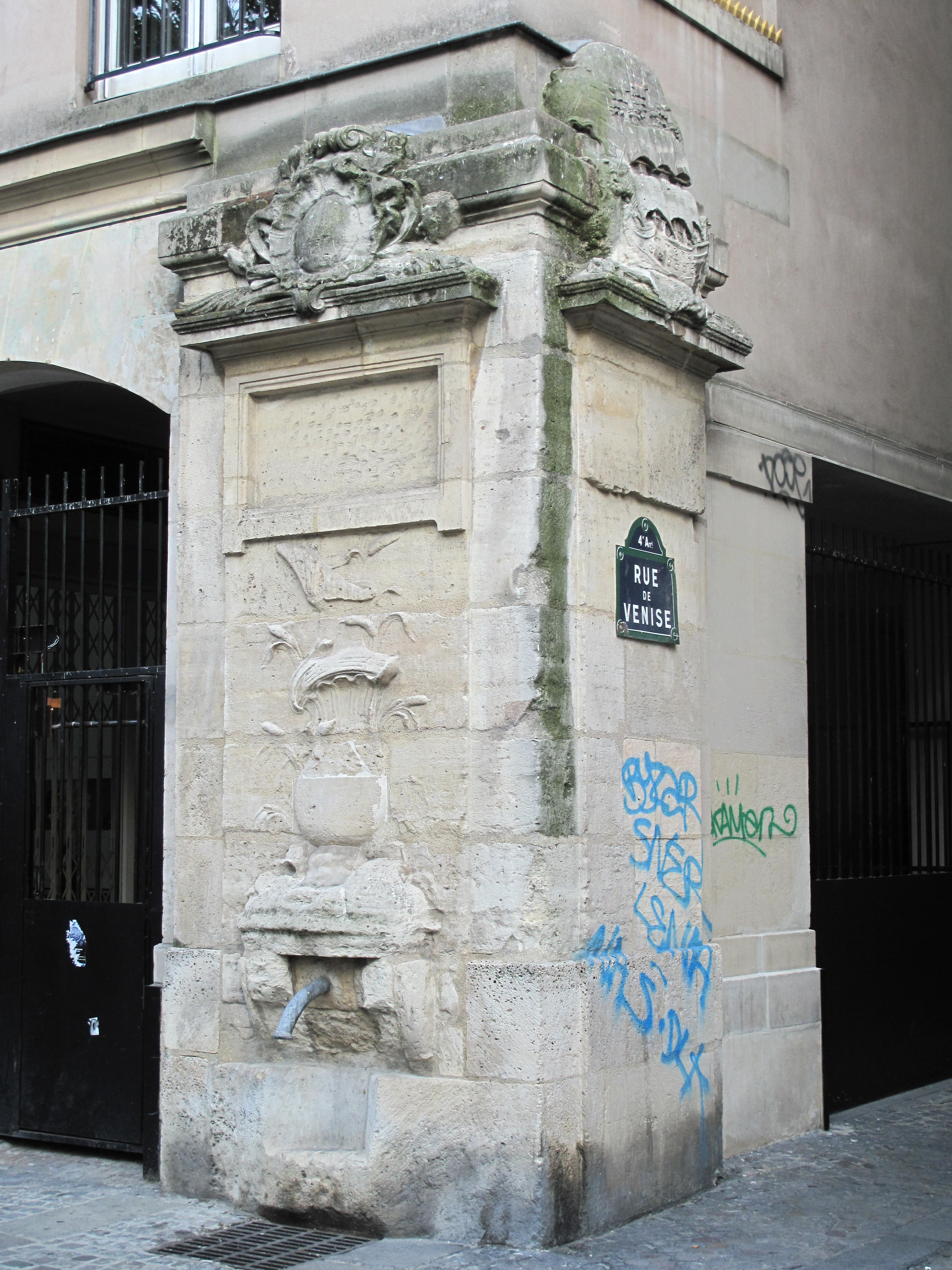
The Fontaine Maubuée at the corner of rue Saint-Martin and rue Venise, in the 4th arrondissement,(1733), Jean Beausire, architect.

== Paris Fountains of the Consulate and the First Empire (1799-1815) ==
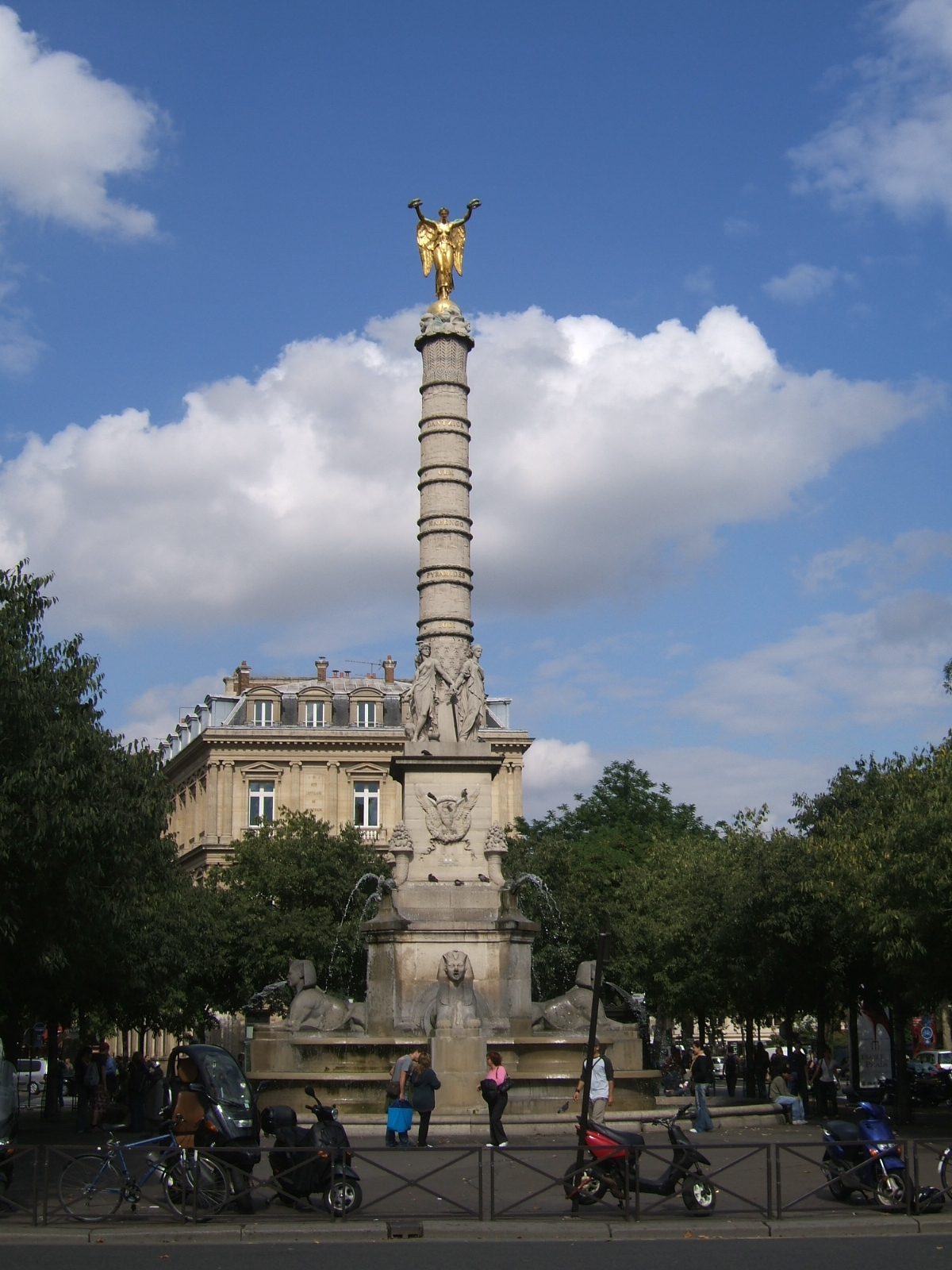
Fontaine du Palmier, Place du Châtelet, (1st arrondissement.) (1806-1808.), honoring Napoleon's victories. François-Jean Bralle, architect.

The building of monumental fountains was interrupted by the French Revolution; the Place Louis XV was renamed Place de la Revolution, and the guillotine was placed near where the fountains were to have been built. The supply of water and the building of fountains became a subject of prime concern for the new First Consul, Napoleon Bonaparte, beginning in 1799.

Napoleon asked his Minister of the Interior, Jean-Antoine Chaptal, what would be the most useful thing he could do for Paris, and Chaptal replied, "Give it water.". In 1802 Napoleon ordered the construction of the first canal bringing water from a river outside the city, the canal d'Ourcq. The canal was built by Napoleon's energetic Chief Engineer of Bridges and Highways and head of his service of water and sewers, Pierre Simon Girard, who had served with him on his campaign in Egypt. Girard's grand projects included the Canal Saint-Denis (finished in 1821), the Canal d'Ourcq (finished in 1822), the Canal Saint-Martin (finished in 1825) which brought enough water for both drinking fountains and decorative fountains.

While his engineers were building canals to bring water to Paris, Napoleon turned his attention to the fountains. In a decree issued May 2, 1806, he announced that it was his wish "to do something grand and useful for Paris." and proposed building fifteen new fountains. He also ordered the cleaning, repair or rebuilding of the many old fountains which had fallen into ruin, such as the Fontaine des Quatre-Saisons and the Medici Fountain. His engineers built new fountains in the city's major outdoor markets, and installed several hundred bornes-fontaines, simple stone blocks with a water tap, all over the city. In 1812, he issued a decree that the distribution of water from fountains would be free, and anyone who speculated in drinking water would be severely punished.

Many of the fifteen monumental fountains built by Napoleon were designed by the same architect, François-Jean Bralle, chief engineer of the water service for the City of Paris, who had worked on the big water pumps at Chaillot, Gros-Caillau and la Samaritaine.

The early Napoleonic fountains, built before the canals were finished, were modest in scale and supplied with a limited amount of water, which poured through the traditional masquerons, or spouts. The later fountains by Napoleon, including the fountain in the Place de Vosges and the Chateau d'eau, were not used primarily for drinking water, and had water shooting into the air and cascading from the vasques into the basins below. These were the first truly decorative fountains in Paris.

- Fontaine place des Invalides. This fountain was one of the first completed under Napoleon, built to display the winged lion from the St. Mark's in Venice, brought to Paris as a war trophy by Napoleon in 1797. It was a simple stone pedestal with four small spouting bronze heads of lions, with the statue of the winged lion on top. The lion was returned to Venice after Napoleon's defeat in 1815, and the fountain was finally removed in 1840.
- Fontaine Desaix. Located in Place Dauphine, this fountain honored the French general Louis Desaix, killed at the battle of Marengo in 1800. It featured a figure of La France Militaire, a woman in a toga and helmet, atop a cylindrical pedestal, with water pouring from spouts around the base. It was taken down when the square was enlarged in 1875 and moved to the city of Riom, Desaix's home, where it still stands.
- Fontaine du Palmier. (1808) In the Place du Châtelet, this is the largest surviving fountain from the Empire, built in the form of a Roman triumphal column with the names of Napoleon's victories and bas reliefs on the column, with a statue of Victory on the top. The name comes from the palm-leaf decoration just below the statue. The base of the column is decorated with four figures representing Prudence, Vigilance, Justice and Strength. In 1856, when rue Sebastopol was built, the column was moved and placed on a new pedestal designed by G. Davioud, ornamented with four sphinxes and basins of water.
- Fontaine de la Paix (1807) originally in Place St. Sulpice, then in Marché saint Germain, now in the Allee du Seminaire, not far away. A neo-classical monument in a square basin, with allegorical figures representing the sciences, the arts, peace, commerce, agriculture, and other figures. The statue was moved in 1937 to its present location.
- Fontaine du Fellah, (1806), built against the wall of hospice des Incurables at 52 rue de Sèvres, was designed by Bralle to resemble an Egyptian temple, with a figure of Antinous, a favorite of the Roman Emperor Hadrian, in Egyptian costume, pouring water from two pitchers. It was designed to commemorate Napoleon's Egyptian campaign, and features an Imperial eagle above the statue.

. *Fontaine du Palais des Arts (1809–1810). Four lions of cast iron, made by the sculptor Antoine Vaudoyer, were placed on separate pedestals in front of the Palais des Beaux-Arts, spouting water from their mouths into two basins. The fountain stopped working in 1865, and the lions were moved to the square of Boulogne-Billancourt, where they can be seen today.

- Fontaine de Mars. This fountain is still in its original location on the rue Saint-Dominque, near the military hospital. It is ornamented with a bas-relief by sculptor Pierre Beauvallet of Mars, god of war, and Hygieia, goddess of health, cleanliness and sanitation, placed together because the statue was near the military hospital.
- Fontaine de Léda. This fountain depicting Leda and the Swan, with water pouring from the beak of the swan, was made by sculptor Achille Valois. It originally stood at the corner of the rue du Regard and rue de Vaugirard. iT was moved in 1856 to the Jardin du Luxembourg, where it is attached to the Medici Fountain.
- Chateau d'eau du boulevard Bondi (1812). This fountain, along with the fountains of Ponceau and those in the Place de Vosges, were the first fountains in Paris where the water itself was the chief decorative element, and the sculpture and architecture were secondary. They were all designed by engineer Pierre Simon Girard. The Chateau d'eau was the first monumental fountain in Paris to feature two circular vasques, or stone basins, one above the other on a column, with water overflowing the basins and falling into a larger circular basin below. This design of fountain had existed on a small scale in Roman gardens and in Rome during the Renaissance, and in Aix-en-Provence, but not in Paris, and not on such a large scale. In addition to the central fountain, cast-iron lions spouted water into the lower basin. The novelty and scale of this fountain made it a popular promenade destination of Parisians. The fountain was moved in 1867, and today is located in front of the former Halle from the demolished Paris market of Les Halles located in la Villette.
- Place des Vosges. (1811). A new fountain designed by Girard was built in the center of the Place des Vosges. It was one of the first in Paris, along with the chateau d'eau, without water taps to fill pitchers or jugs. It had an octagonal basin, with water spouting upwards and splashing into the basin. The originals by Girard were removed in 1824 and replaced in about 1830 with new fountains by Jean-François Ménager.
- Fontaine de l'elephant. The grandest of all Napoleonic fountains was begun in 1811, in the empty space where the Bastille had stood. Work began on the construction of a fountain in the form of a huge bronze elephant, with an observation platform on its back reached by a stairway inside the elephant. The basin for water base was constructed, along with a full-size plaster model of the elephant, but work stopped after the defeat of Napoleon at Waterloo in 1815. The model elephant was not removed until 1848.
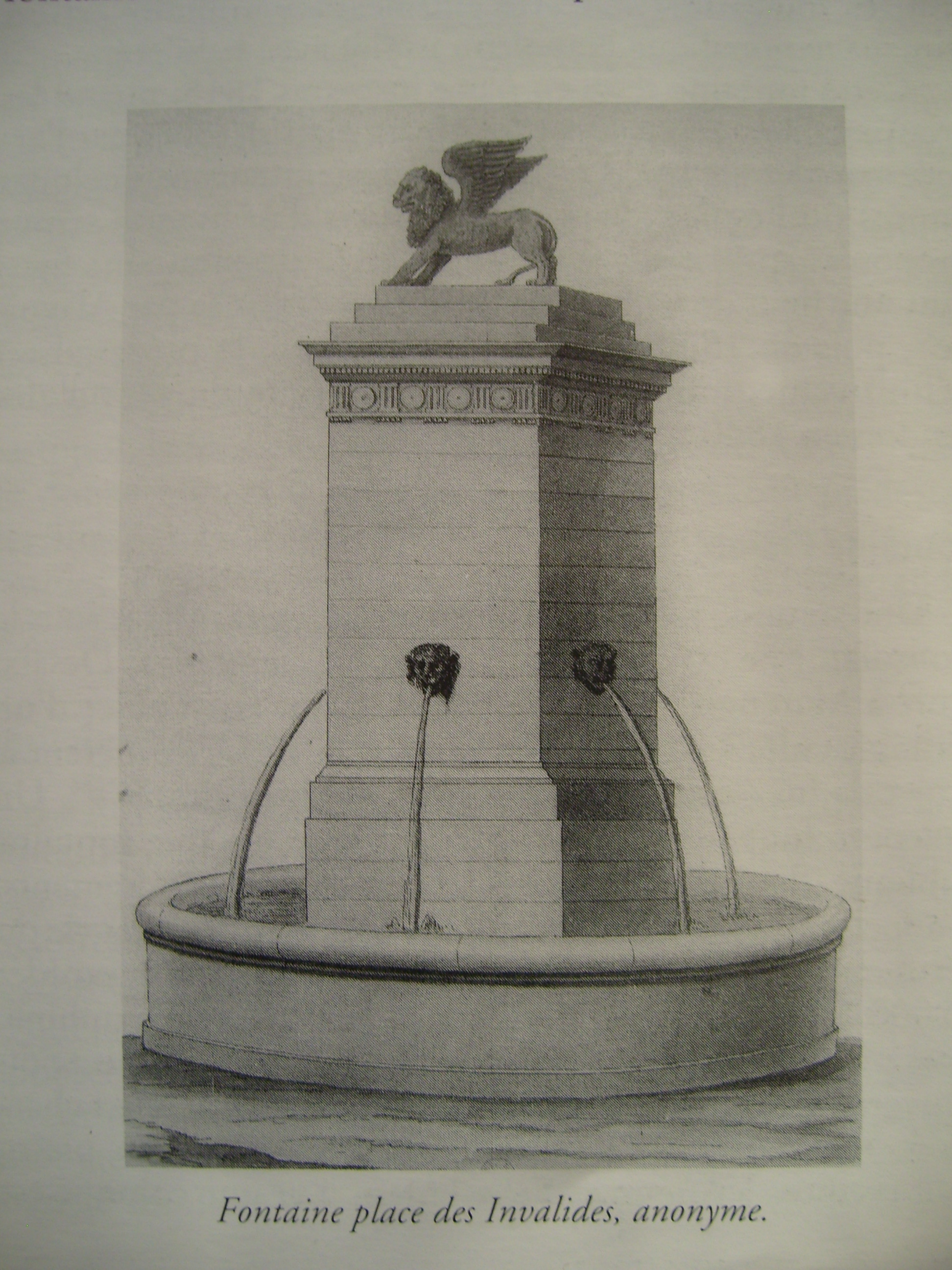
The Fontaine des Invalides (1800-1804), on the Esplanade of the Hotel des Invalides, built to display the winged lion from the Cathedral of St. Mark in Venice, The statue was returned after 1815, and the fountain removed in 1840. (Bibliothèque nationale de France, cabinet des estampes)

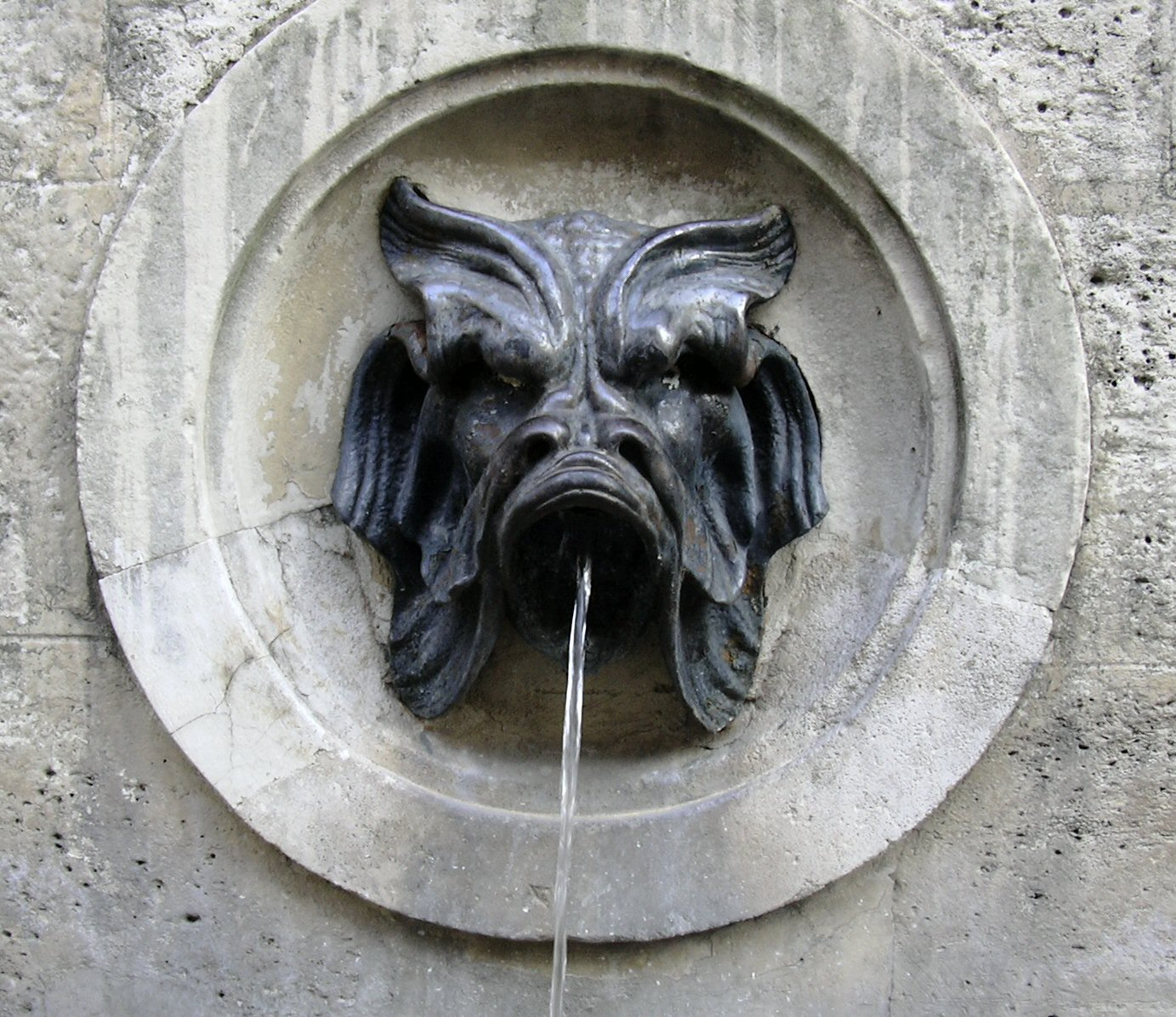
Masqueron of the Fontaine du Gros Caillou, or Fontaine de Mars, rue Saint-Dominique, 7th arrondissement (1806). François-Jean Bralle, architect, Pierre Nicolas Beauvallet, sculptor.

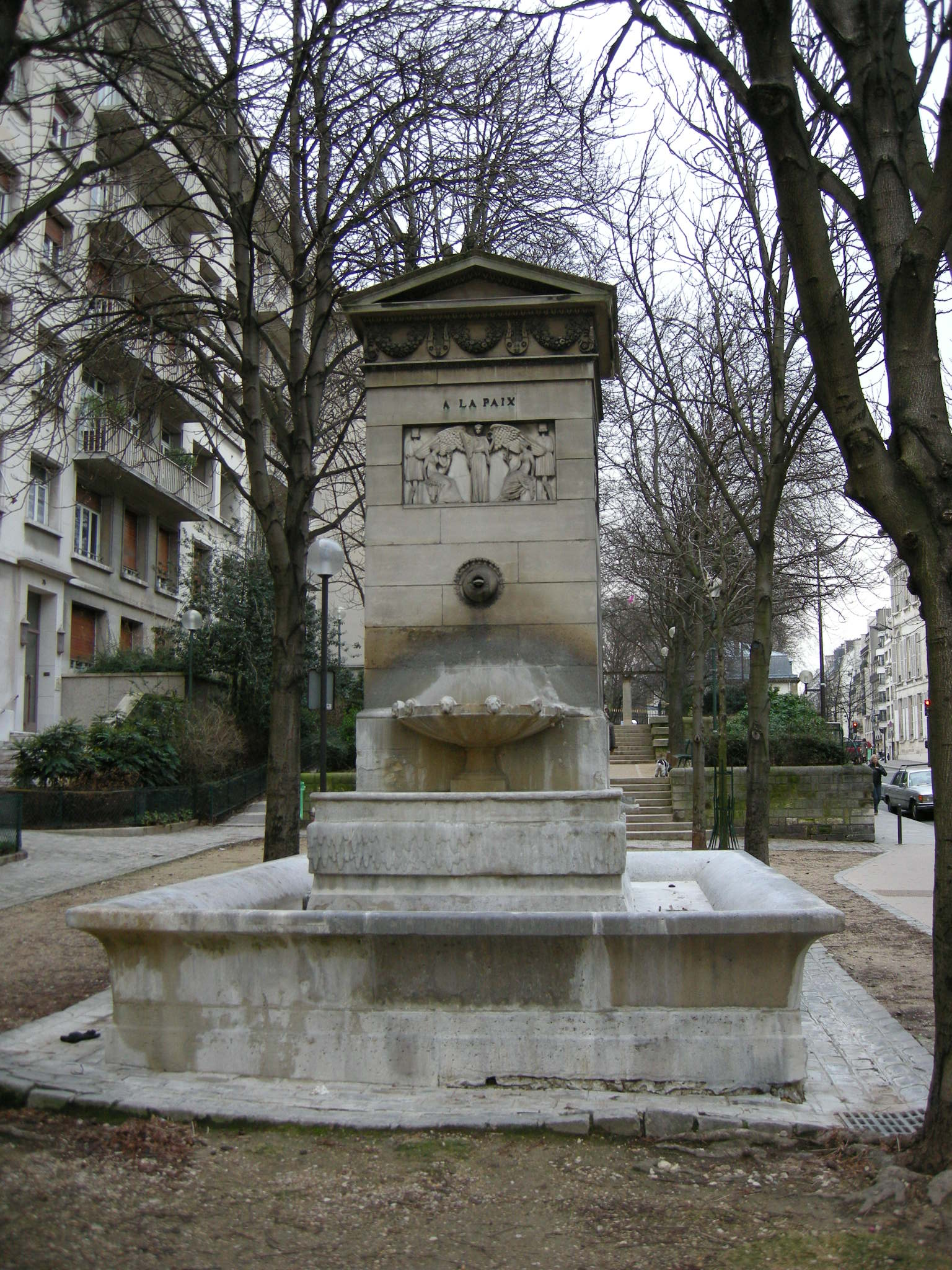
Fontaine de la Paix, Allée du Seminaire, 6th arrondissement, (1806-1810). Originally in Place Saint-Sulpice, then in the marché Saint-Germain. Detournelle, architect, Caraffe, Voinier, Jean-Joseph Espercieux and Marquois, sculptors.

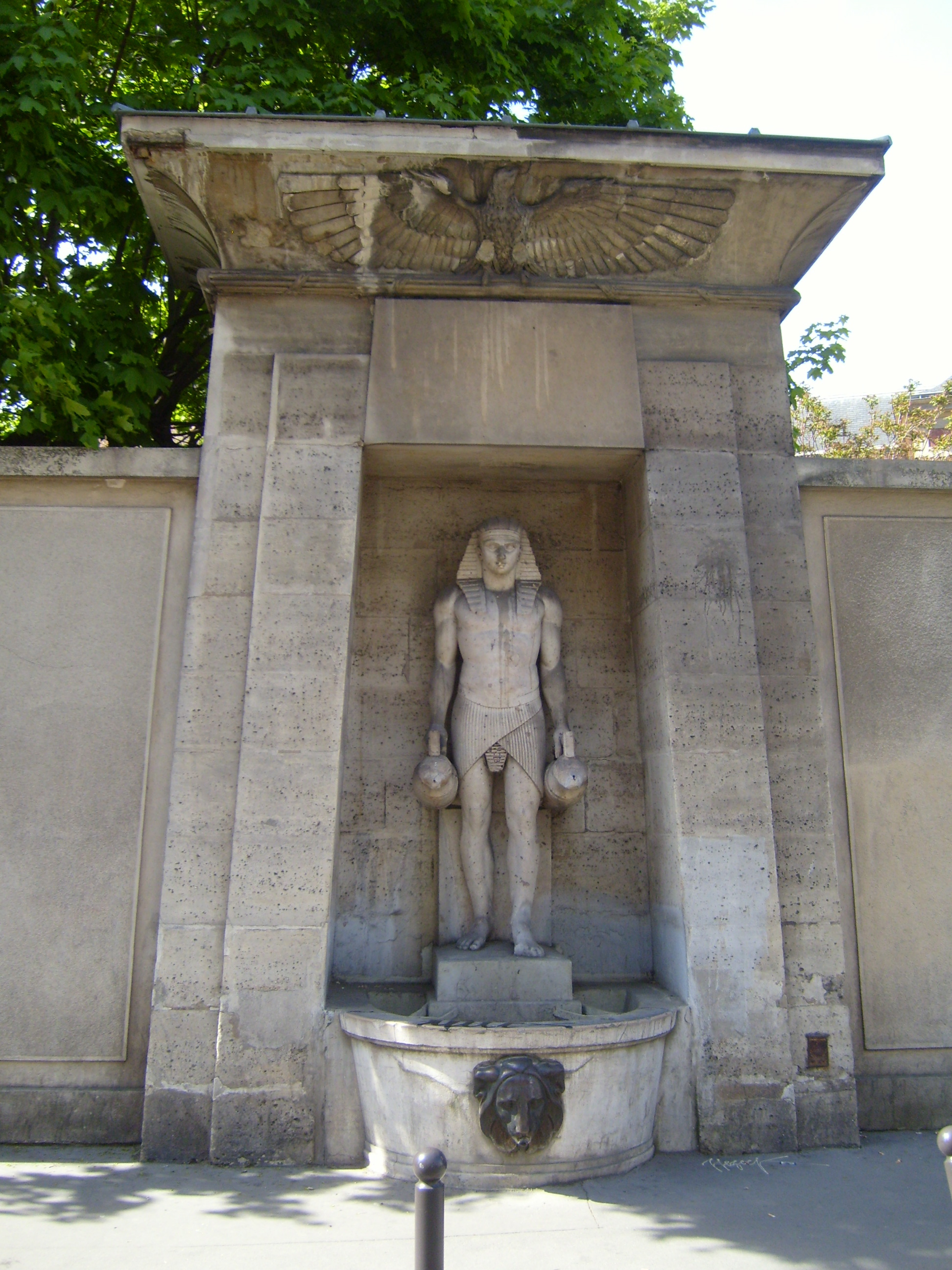
The Fontaine du Fellah (1806), on the rue de Sèvres, was inspired by Napoleon's Egyptian campaign.

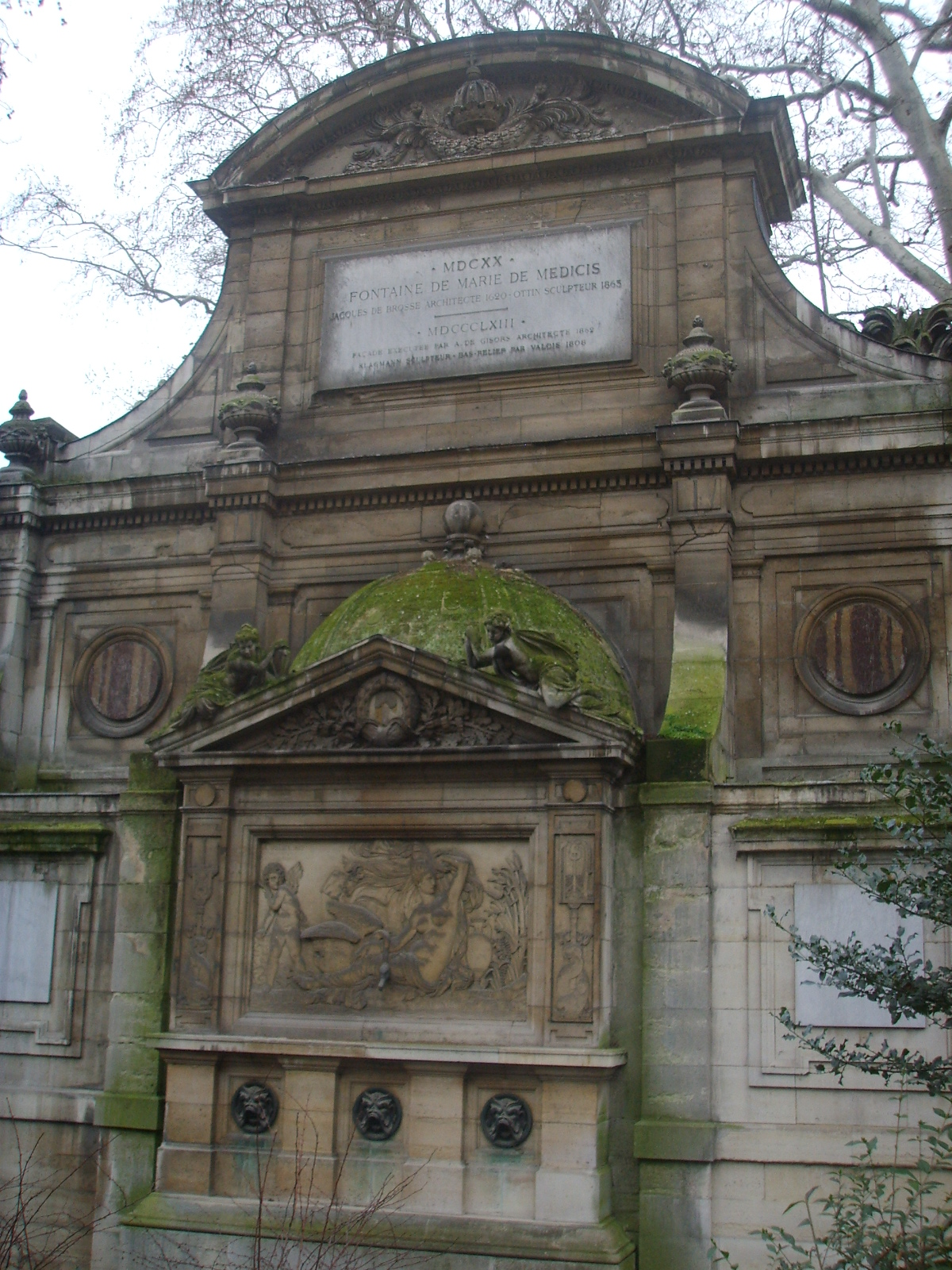
The Fontaine de Léda, (1806–1809), originally at rue Vaugirard and rue du Regard, since 1858 hidden behind the Medici Fountain in the Jardin du Luxembourg. Louis-Simon Bralle, architect, Achille Valois, sculptor.

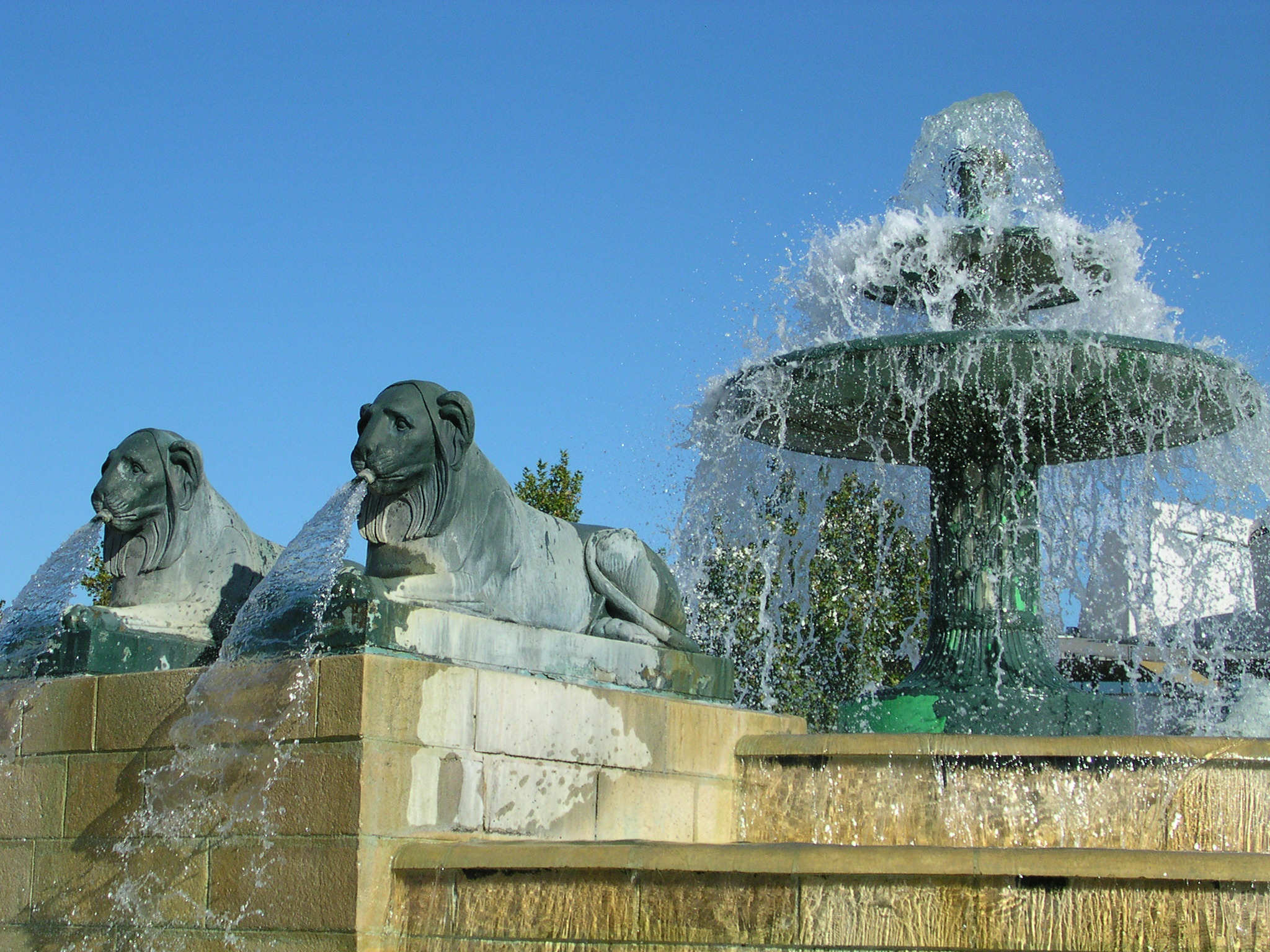
The Fountain of the Chateau d'Eau, (1809-1812), Pierre-Simon Girard, architect. originally at the corner of rue de Bondy and Boulevard Saint-Martin, now in Parc de la villette, 19th arrondissement.

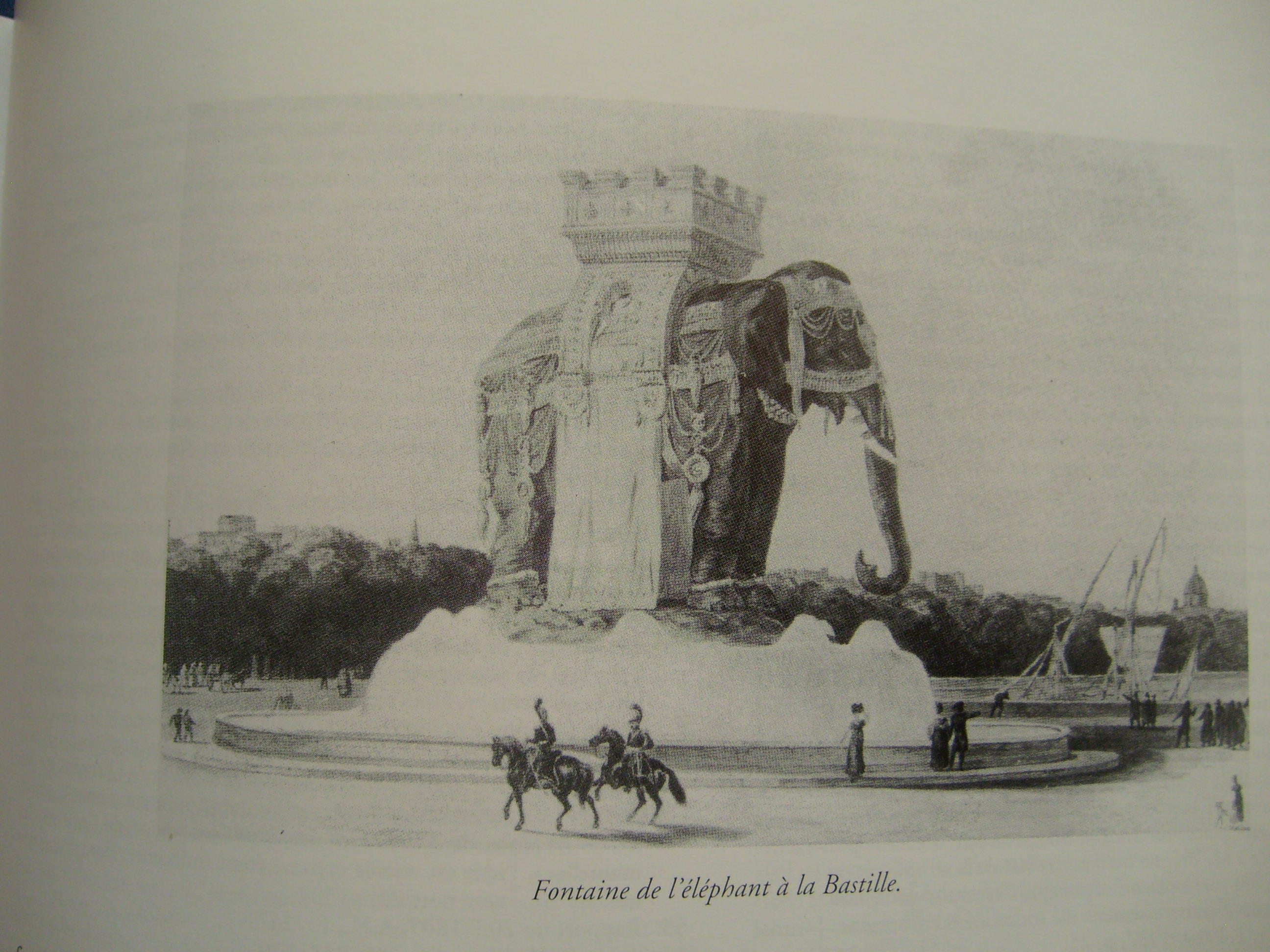
The Fontaine de l'elephant in the Place de Bastille. The fountain was begun in 1811 but never finished. A full-scale plaster model of the elephant stood in the Square until 1848. A guardian and his family lived inside one of the feet to protect the monument.

== Paris Fountains of the Restoration and the Reign of Louis-Philippe (1816–1848) ==
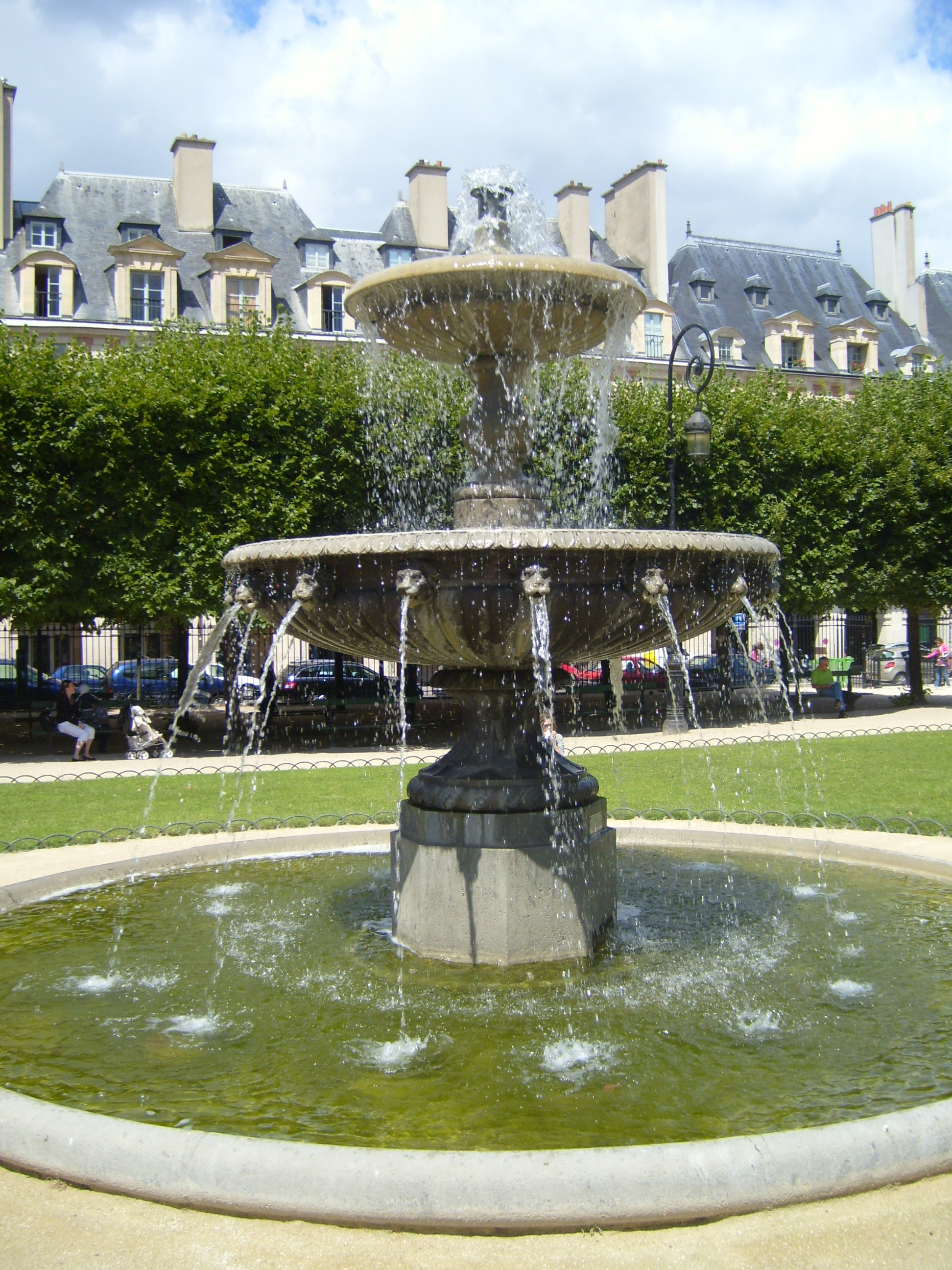
Fountain in the Place des Vosges, (4th arrondissement), The original fountain by Pierre Simon Girard in the Place des Vosges was replaced in 1830 by four fountains, designed by Jean-François-Julien Ménager.

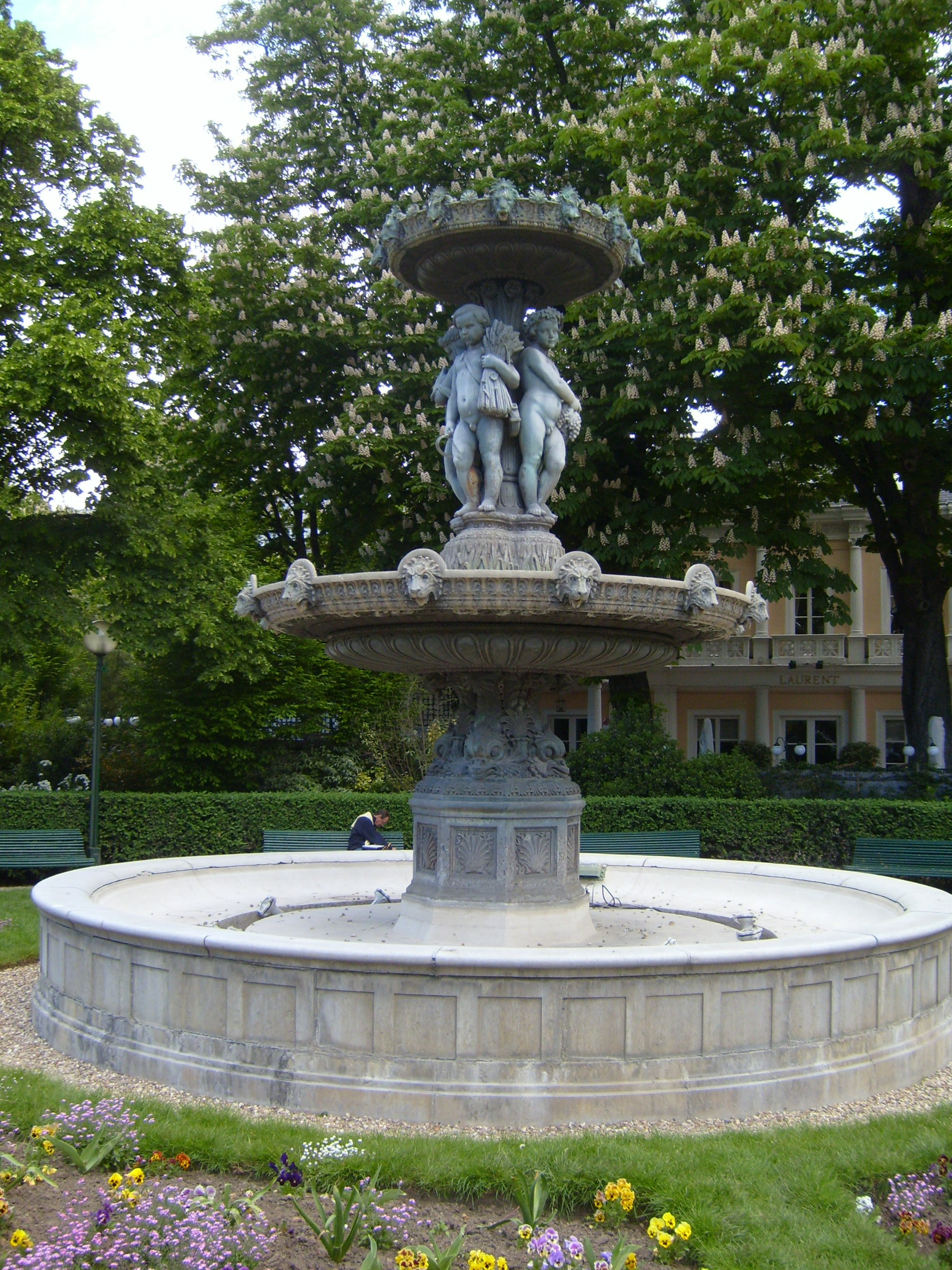
the Fontaine du Cirque was placed in the new Gardens of the Champs-Élysées by Hittorff shortly after he finished the Place de la Concorde. The four children on the fountain represent the four seasons.

From the fall of Napoleon in 1815 to the coming to power of Louis Philippe in 1830, as France went through the Restoration of the old monarchy, few new fountains were built, and they were of modest size and artistic ambitions. Between 1813 and 1819 a new market, the marché des Blancs-Manteaux, was constructed by the rue des Hospitaliers. The fountain in the meat market was adorned with bronze spouts in the shape of bull's heads by the sculptor Edme Gaulle. The market was demolished in 1910 but the heads still remain, now attached to the wall of an ecole maternelle.

Place des Vosges (1830). The original fountain by Pierre Simon Girard in the Place des Vosges (renamed la place Royale during the Restoration) was replaced in 1830 by the current four fountains, designed by Jean-François-Julien Ménager, a student of Vaudoyer, winner of the prix de Rome, and architect of the City of Paris. The new fountains are made of volcanic stone from Volvic in the Auvergne, and have two circular vasques one above the other, with lions' heads spouting water into the circular basin.

The Fontaine de Gaillon (1828) on the rue d'Antin (2nd arronidissement) was the first major fountain by Louis Visconti, which replaced an earlier fountain by Beausire. Visconti later became famous as the architect of the tomb of Napoleon in the Invalides. The fountain has two vasques, decorated with a young triton armed with a trident and a horse on a dolphin, and an inscription in Latin: "for the utility and ornament of the city."

In July 1830 the absolute monarchy of Charles X was overthrown and replaced by the constitutional monarchy of Louis-Philippe. The new government, like earlier ones, faced the problem of a rapidly growing population in Paris, whose need for water was far greater than Napoleon's canal de l'Ourq could supply. Public fountains caused congestion in the narrow streets; carriage and wagon drivers watered their horses in the fountains; water porters fought with local residents for access to the water taps; the fountains in markets were used to wash vegetables and fruits and to clean the streets. A cholera epidemic in 1832 made it evident that Paris needed better water and better sanitation.

The new Préfet of the Seine, Rambuteau, ordered the construction of two hundred kilometers of new water pipes and the installation of 1700 borne-fontaines, the simple blocks with water taps introduced by Napoleon. Thanks to these new fountains, which supplied drinking water to the population, the city's architects had the freedom to design new monumental fountains that were purely ornamental in the city's squares.

Fontaines de la Concorde. (1836–1840) The two fountains in the Place de la Concorde are the most famous of the fountains built during the time of Louis-Philippe, and came to symbolize the fountains of Paris. They were designed by Jacques-Ignace Hittorff, a student of the neoclassical sculptor Charles Percier at the École des Beaux-Arts, who had served as the official Architect of Festivals and Ceremonies for the deposed King, and had spent two years studying the architecture and fountains of Italy.

Hittorff's two fountains are both on maritime themes, because of their proximity to the Ministry of Navy on the Place de la Concorde, and to the Seine. Their arrangement, on a north–south axis aligned with the obelisque of Luxor, and the Rue Royale; and the form of the fountains themselves, were strongly influenced by the fountains of Rome, particularly Piazza Navona and the square of St. Peters.

Both fountains have the same form: a stone basin; six figures of tritons or naiades holding fish spouting water; six seated allegorical figures, their feet on the prows of ships, supporting the piedouche, or pedestal, of the circular vasque; four statues of different forms of genius, arts or crafts supporting the upper inverted upper vasque; whose water shoots up and then cascades down to the lower vasque and then the basin.

The north fountain is devoted to the Rivers, with allegorical figures representing the Rhone and the Rhine, the arts of the harvesting of flowers and fruits, harvesting and grape growing; and the geniuses of river navigation, industry, and agriculture.

The south fountain, closer to the Seine, represents the seas, with figures representing the Atlantic and the Mediterranean; harvesting coral; harvesting fish; collecting shellfish; collecting pearls; and the geniuses of astronomy, navigation and commerce.

Fontaines des Champs-Élysées. (1839–1840). Having finished the fontaines de la Concorde, Hittorff built four additional fountains in the squares on the Champs-Élysées between the Place de la Concorde and the Arc de Triomphe, which had just been finished in 1836. The lower part of each fountain is the same; a circular basin, a pedestal with seashell ornamentation; a vasque supported by dolphins and ornamented with palm leaves; and (on three of the four) lion heads spouting water.

The upper part of each fountain was different;

Carré des Ambassadeurs - a Venus brushing her hair, surrounded by roses and flowing water. (sculptor: Francique-Joseph Duret.) Carré le Doyen - statue of Diana with roses. (Sculptor: Louis Desprez) Fontaine de Cirque (north side): Four children, representing the four seasons, with a second vasque decorated with the heads of lions and wild boars. (Sculptor: Jean-Auguste Barre). Fontaine de l'Elysée (north side). A simple single vasque with cascading water.

The Fontaine Louvois (1839), by architect Louis Visconti, was built in the new Place Louvois, on the site of the old opera house. The lower vasque is decorated with signs of the zodiac and masks of the seasons; four female figures representing the rivers Seine, Loire, Garonne and Saône surround the column supporting the upper vasque. The figures and vasques were made of cast iron, painted to look like bronze.

Fontaine Cuvier (1840–1846). Dedicated to Georges Cuvier (1769–1832), the naturalist, pioneer of paleontology and comparative anatomy. This fountain is located near the Jardin des Plantes and the museum of natural history, where Cuvier had worked. The statue is placed against a wall, with a low basin, water pouring from the heads of reptiles, and a band of human and animal heads. Above that is an allegorical figure of a seated woman representing Natural History, surrounded by numerous animals, and holding a tablet with Cuvier's motto: "Rerum cognoscere causas." ("to know the causes of things.") Naturalists pointed out that the crocodile in the group of statues of is turning its head, something that crocodiles are unable to do.

Visconti, who later became famous as the designer of the tomb of Napoleon in the Invalides, designed two other fountains of this new type, commemorating famous Parisians and located in places associated with them.

Fontaine Molière. (1841–44). This fountain by Visconti, located at the corner of rue Traversière and rue Richelieu, was originally going to be a simple Renaissance fountain with a state of a nymph, but Régnier, the head of the Comédie Française, proposed that it be instead a monument to the playwright Molière, since the fountain was near the original site of the Comédie Française and the home of Molière. A public subscription raised money for the fountain. The bronze statue of Molière is by Bernard-Gabriel Seurre, and the two allegorical figures at the base of the fountain, representing Light Comedy and Serious Comedy, are by James Pradier.

Fontaine Saint-Sulpice, (1843–1848), by Louis Visconti was designed to represent the idea of religious elequence, since it was located on Place Saint-Sulpice, near the famous theological seminary of St. Sulpice. It honored four famous religious orators of the 17th century; Bossuet, Fénelon, Fléchier, and Massillon.

Fontaine de l'Archevêche (1843–1845), by Alphonse Vigoureux, located on the present day square Jean XXIII, is a neo-Gothic structure built where the archbishop's palace once stood. The lower part of the fountain shows three archangels defeating the allegorical figure of heresy, while the spire contains a statue of the Virgin and child.

Several more modest fountains from the time of Louis-Philippe still exist:

- Fontaine Place Jean-Baptiste Clément', (1835), in Montmartre, is a wall fountain with a niche decorated with seashell pattern, and a bronze vase with water flowing from a lion's head.
- Fontaine Charlemagne, rue Charlemagne, (1835), built against the wall of presbytere of the Church of St. Paul. In the niche, decorated with aquatic plants and animals, is a vasque of cast iron supported by dolphins, with a statue of a child holding a seashell over his head.
- Fontaine Saint-Louis, rue de Tourenne. (1846). Similar to Fontaine Charlemagne, with vasque in the form of a seashell and a figure in zinc representing the Ourq River. The coat of arms of Paris is carved on the upper part of the fountain. The sculptor is Boitel, a pupil of James Pradier and David d'Angers.
- Fontaine de la Roquette, rue de la Roquette, (1846), an arcade with a triangular fronton, decorated with the arms of Paris, dolphins, and fruit, floral patterns and lion heads. Inside the niche are two benches and a mascaron from which water still flows, though the fountain is closed with a gate.
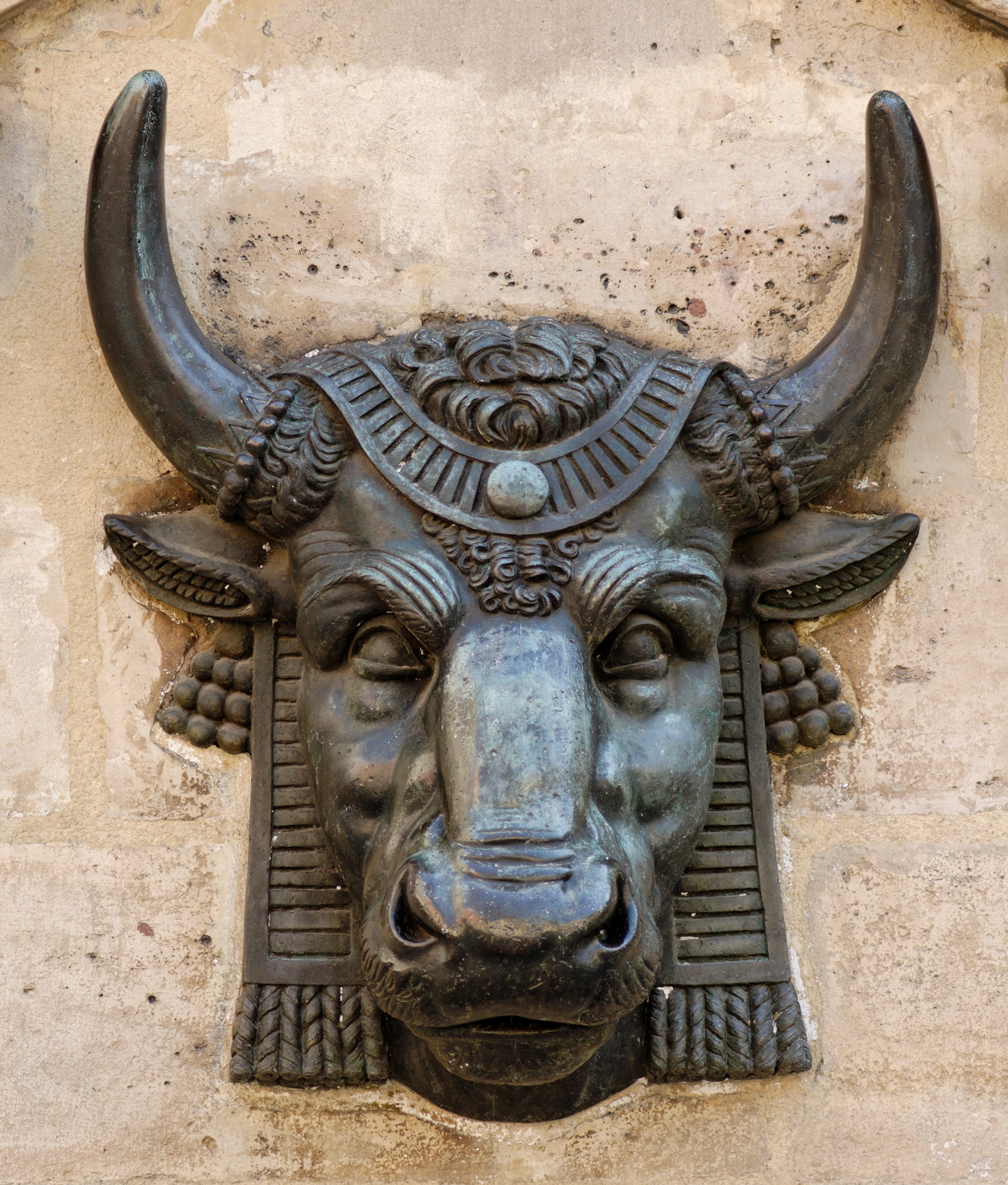
Bronze bull's head, a spout of the meat market fountain of Paris's marché des Blanc-Manteaux, by sculptor Edme Gaulle (1819)

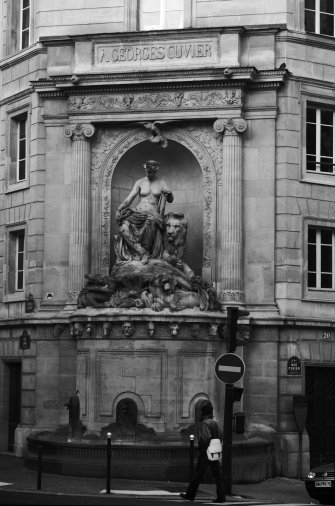
Fontaine Cuvier, Corner of rue Cuvier and rue Linné, 5th arrondissement (1840-1846), Alphonse Vigouroux, architect and Jean-Jacques Feuchère and René Jules Pomateau, sculptors.

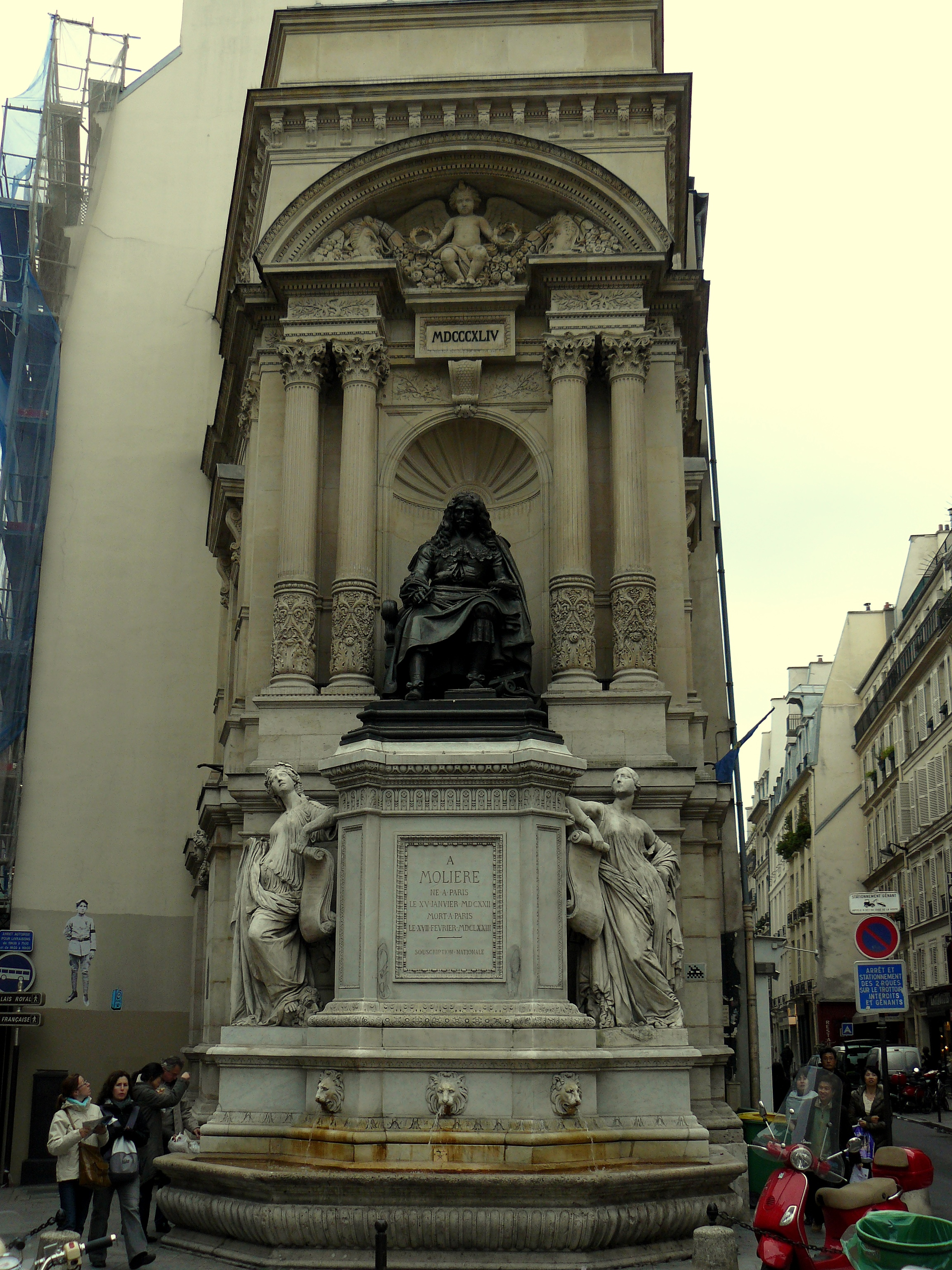
Fontaine Molière, 37 rue de Richelieu (1st arrondissement), (1841-1844), Louis Visconti, architect and Bernard-Gabriel Seurre and James Pradier, sculptors.

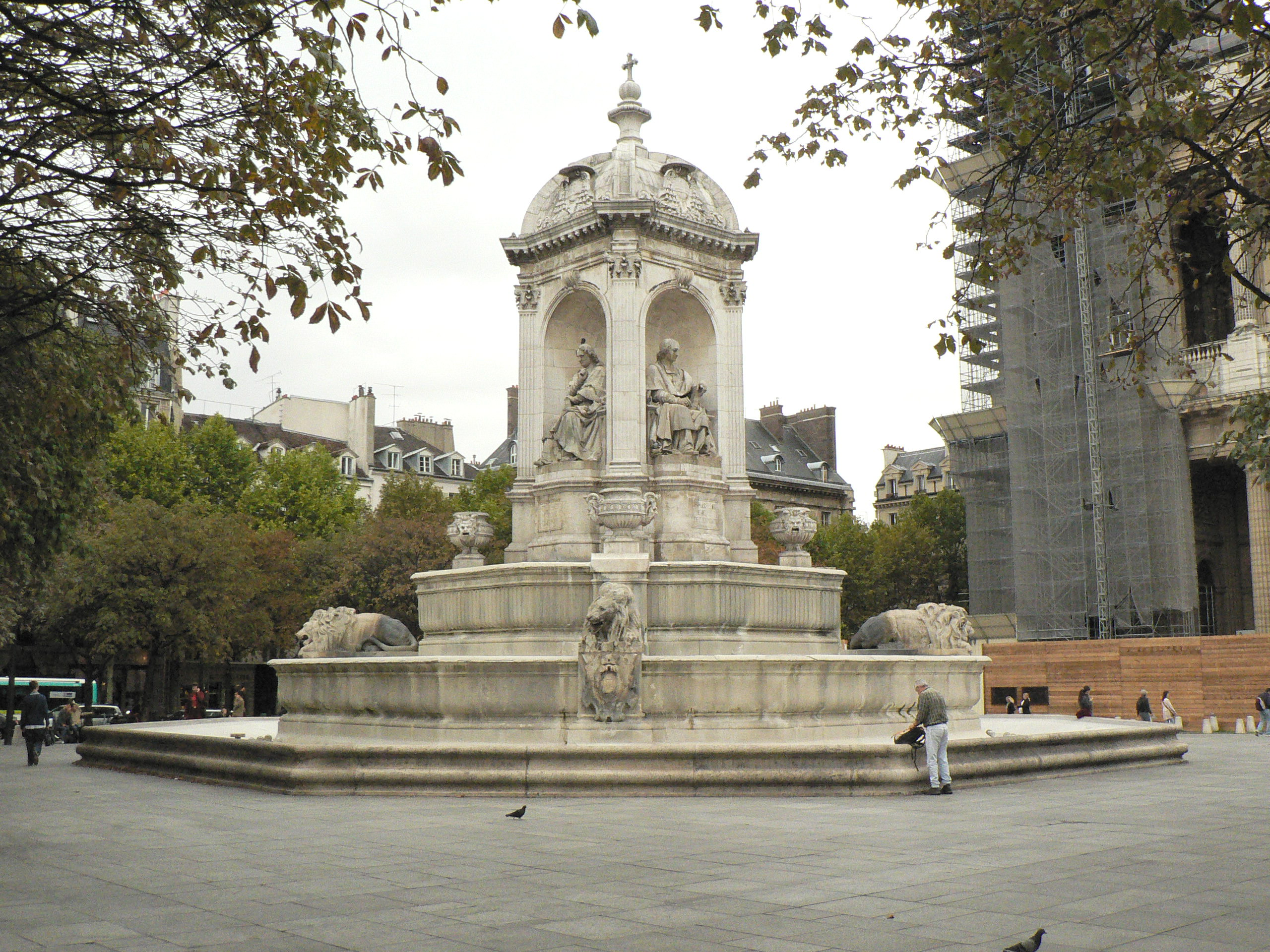
Fontaine de Saint-Sulpice, Place Saint-Sulpice, (1843-1848), Louis Visconti, architect.

== Paris Fountains of Louis-Napoleon and the second Empire (1848-1870) ==
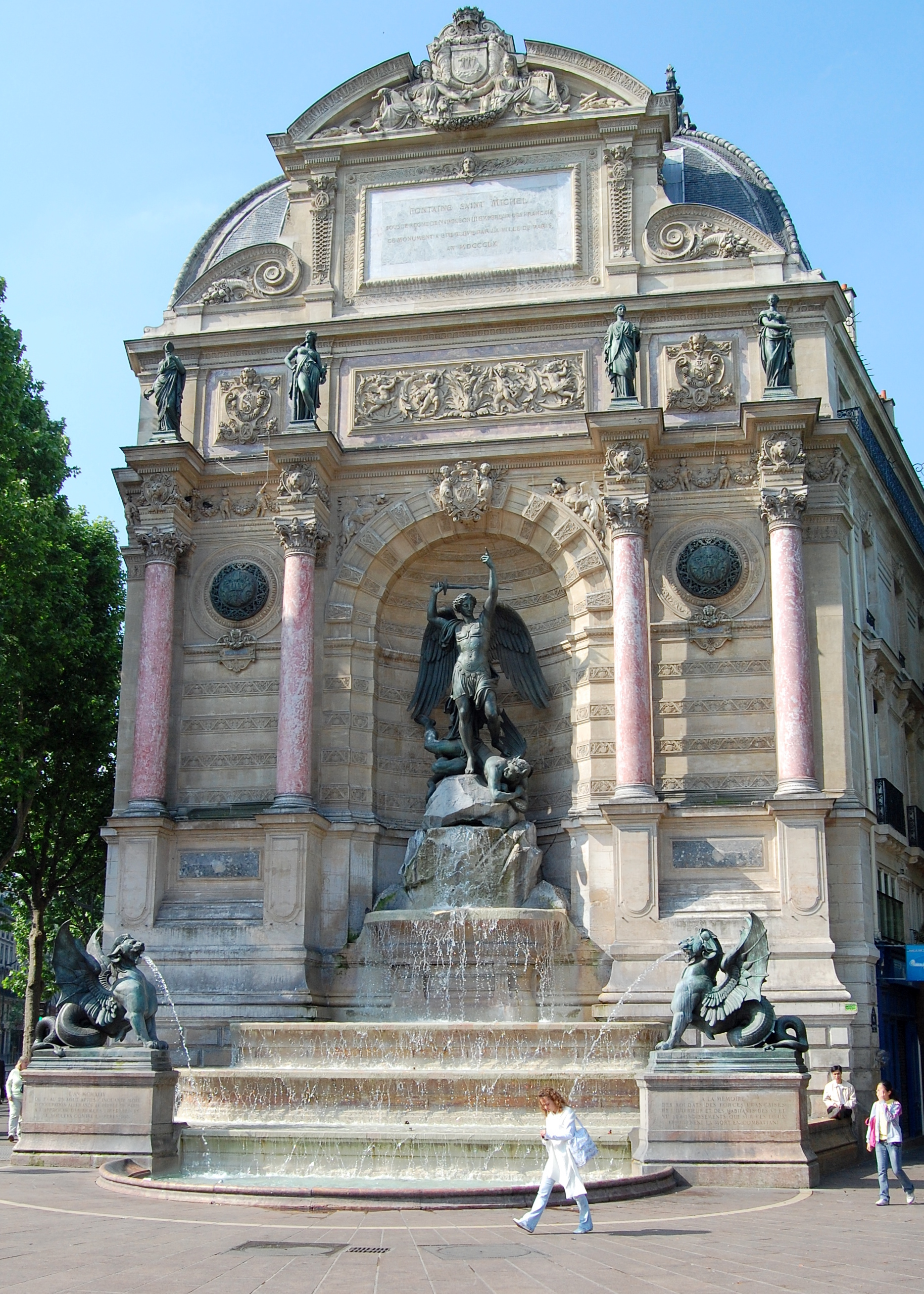
Fontaine Saint-Michel, Place Saint-Michel, (1858-1860), Gabriel Davioud, architect.

The reign of Louis-Philippe ended abruptly with the Revolution of 1848, and the establishment of the Second Republic, under Louis Napoleon, which became, by a coup d'état in 1851, the Second Empire. After an epidemic of cholera in 1849, one of Louis Napoleon's highest priorities became improving the quality of the water of Paris. At the time Paris had about sixty fountains supplying drinking water for the population, and a dozen fountains which were purely ornamental. Under his new préfet of the Seine, Baron Haussmann, and his new chief of the waters of Paris, Belgrand, the Paris water system was reconstructed so that water from springs, brought by aqueducts, was used exclusively for drinking water, while less healthy river water was used for washing the streets, watering gardens and parks, and for fountains.

During the Second Empire, as Baron Haussmann launched his reconstruction campaign, famous old fountains were relocated and rebuilt. In 1858 the Fontaine des Innocents was moved to a new, lower pedestal in the middle of the square, and six basins of flowing water were added on each side., In 1864, to make room for the new boulevard des Medicis, the orangerie behind the Medici Fountain was demolished, the fountain was moved to a new location in the Jardin du Luxembourg, statues were added, the fountain of Leda and the Swan, built during the first Empire, was moved to a place behind it, and a long basin built in front of it. The modest original fountain in the Rond-Point of the Champs-Élysées, built under Louis-Philippe, with just two vasques, was replaced by a larger fountain with six vasques cascading water.

Most of the new monumental fountains built during the reign of Louis Napoleon were the work of a single architect, Gabriel Davioud. Davioud studied sculpture at the École des Beaux-Arts, then became architect of the service de promenades et plantations of the prefecture of the Seine. He was responsible for the design of many of the squares, gates, benches, pavilions, and other decorative architecture of the Second Empire. His principal basins and fountains were:

- Fontaines Boulevard Richard-Lenoir. (1862.) When part of the canal St. Martin was covered by the Boulevard Richard Lenoir, Davioud built a long series of fifteen small basins and fountains to aerate the water. Each fountain had a spray of water coming from a bouquet of roses made of cast iron. The fountains were rebuilt in a more modern, less picturesque style in the 20th century.
- Fontaine Place Edmond-Rostand. Davioud built the basin and fountain first, in 1862. In 1884, the statue by Crauk of a triton and a naiade, holding a large seashell spraying water. was added to the fountain.
- Fontaine de la place Pigalle. (1862-63.) The fountain has a circular basin, an octagonal pedestal and a fluted column supporting a single vasque. It was used by residents as a basin place to dump trash, to wash fish, and to do laundry. Today the fountain and place have been renovated.
- Fontaine Square des Arts-et-Metiers (now called Square Emile-Chatemps) (1861). The fountain is composed of an oblong basin with semi-circular ends, in which are placed allegorical statues related to arts and professions, since the fountain was next to the conservatory of arts and metiers. On one side are two statues by Ottin, who also did the statues in the Medici Fountain; a statue of Mercury, holding a scale, an anchor, and a horn of plenty; and Music, wearing a laurel wreath, holding a lyre and a torch. On the other end of the fountain are two statues by Gumery; Agriculture, holding sheaves of wheat, and Work, holding a hammer. Between the two groups is a single vasque fountain with a spray of water and water pouring from the heads of lions.
- Fontaine place de la Madeleine (1865). (one now located in square Santiago-du-Chili, the other to place François Iier). Davioud built two fountains in front of the Madeleine church, each with a circular marble basin, a pedestal with four griffins, supporting a column with a single vasque decorated with lion heads spouting water. From the vasque rises a column decorated with rings and faces of women. In 1902 both fountains were moved to different parts of Paris to make room for a statue of philosopher and politician Jules Simon.
- Fontaine Saint-Michel (1860) is the best-known fountain of Davioud. Built as part of Baron Haussmann's grand project for the reconstruction of Paris, it was intended be the chief ornament of the enlarged Place Pont-Saint-Michel created by the new boulevard Sebastopol-rive gauche, now Boulevard Saint-Michel). Davioud originally wanted a free-standing fountain with a statue of a woman representing peace, but he was required to make a wall fountain hiding the wall of a building at the corner of boulevard Saint-Michel and Saint-André des Arts. His new design featured a structure like a triumphal arch with a statue of Napoleon Bonaparte, but this aroused opposition by the opponents of Louis Napoleon, so it was changed to a statue of the Archangel Michael wrestling with the devil. Nine sculptors worked on the different figures in the composition. It was the last monumental fountain in Paris built against a wall, a style that had been borrowed from Italy and used in the Medici Fountain and the Fontaine des Quatre-Saisons. Later fountains would be free-standing, in the center of squares or parks.

== Paris Fountains of the Third Republic (1870-1900) ==
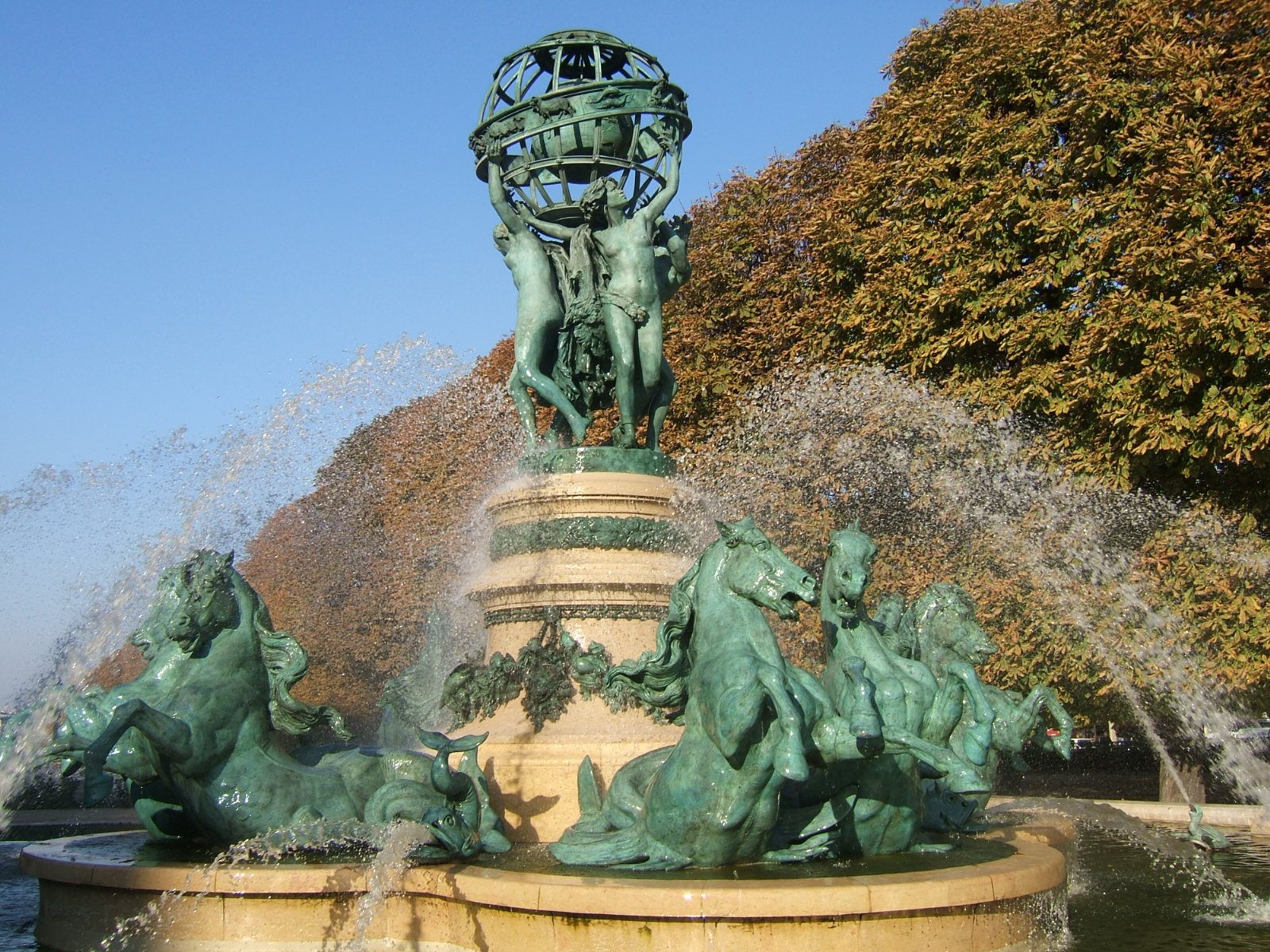
Fontaine de l'Observatoire, (1867-1874), Jardin du Luxembourg, Gabriel Davioud, architect.

Louis Napoleon was captured by the Germans at the disastrous battle of Sedan in 1870 and lost his title. After the occupation of Paris by the Germans and the brief rule of the Paris Commune, the Third French Republic was born. Davioud remained as the chief architect of fountains for the city. His first task was to repair the damage caused to the fountains by the German siege of Paris and the fighting during the suppression of the Paris Commune, which had destroyed the Tuilieries Palace and the Hotel de Ville.

Davioud was able to complete two monumental fountains begun under the Second Empire.

- The Fontaine de l'Observatoire, with sculpture by Jean-Baptiste Carpeaux. This fountain had been proposed in 1866 as part of the creation of the new grand avenue du Luxembourg, a project which called the creation of two new squares, with ornamental lamps and columns, statues, and a fountain. Carpeaux had made the sculptures of La Danse on the facade of the Paris Opera; these had caused a scandal because of the free expression of the sculpture and the unrestrained emotions on the faces of the statues, much different from the calm expressions of neo-classical statues.

Davioud instructed Carpeaux not to block he view of the Luxembourg Palace or the Paris Observatory, but otherwise he had freedom to design what he wanted. He proposed four figures representing the four corners of the world, holding aloft a celestial sphere, and trying to turn it. The sculptor LeGrain was commissioned to make the sphere, and the sculptor Emmanuel Frémier made the horses in the basin around the statue.

Work on the fountain was stopped because of the war in 1870, but resumed in 1872, and it was dedicated in 1874.

- Fontaine du Triomphe de la République, Place de la Nation, (1899). In 1879, the place Château d'Eau was renamed place de la République, and a competition was held for a monument in the center. The architect François-Charles Morice and his sculptor brother Leopold won the competition, but a project by another sculptor, Aimé-Jules Dalou, won the most public favor. Dalou had participated in the Paris Commune uprising in 1871 and had been sentenced to forced labor for life, then exiled to London. He designed a twelve-meter high group of allegorical statues: at the base is the Chariot of the Nation was drawn by two lions, led by the Spirit of Liberty and surrounded by figures representing Law, Work, Justice, Peace, and the Spirit of Instruction. A terrestrial globe supports the figure of the Republique, a woman in classical costume, wearing a liberty cap and holding the fasces, the Roman symbol of the law.

The Prefecture instructed Davioud to replace the old fountain of the Place du Trône with the Dalou's monument in the renamed Place de la Nation. The statues were cast in bronze, A basin was rebuilt, and the fountain opened in 1899. Later, in 1908, six bronze amphibian animals spouting water sculpted by Georges Gardet were added to the basin.

The bronze statues of the amphibians were taken by the Germans during World War II and disappeared. The basin was removed in the 1960 to make way for the RER regional railway station, but the statues, without basin or water, are still there.

- Fontaines place André Malraux (formerly Place du Théatre-Française.) (1874).
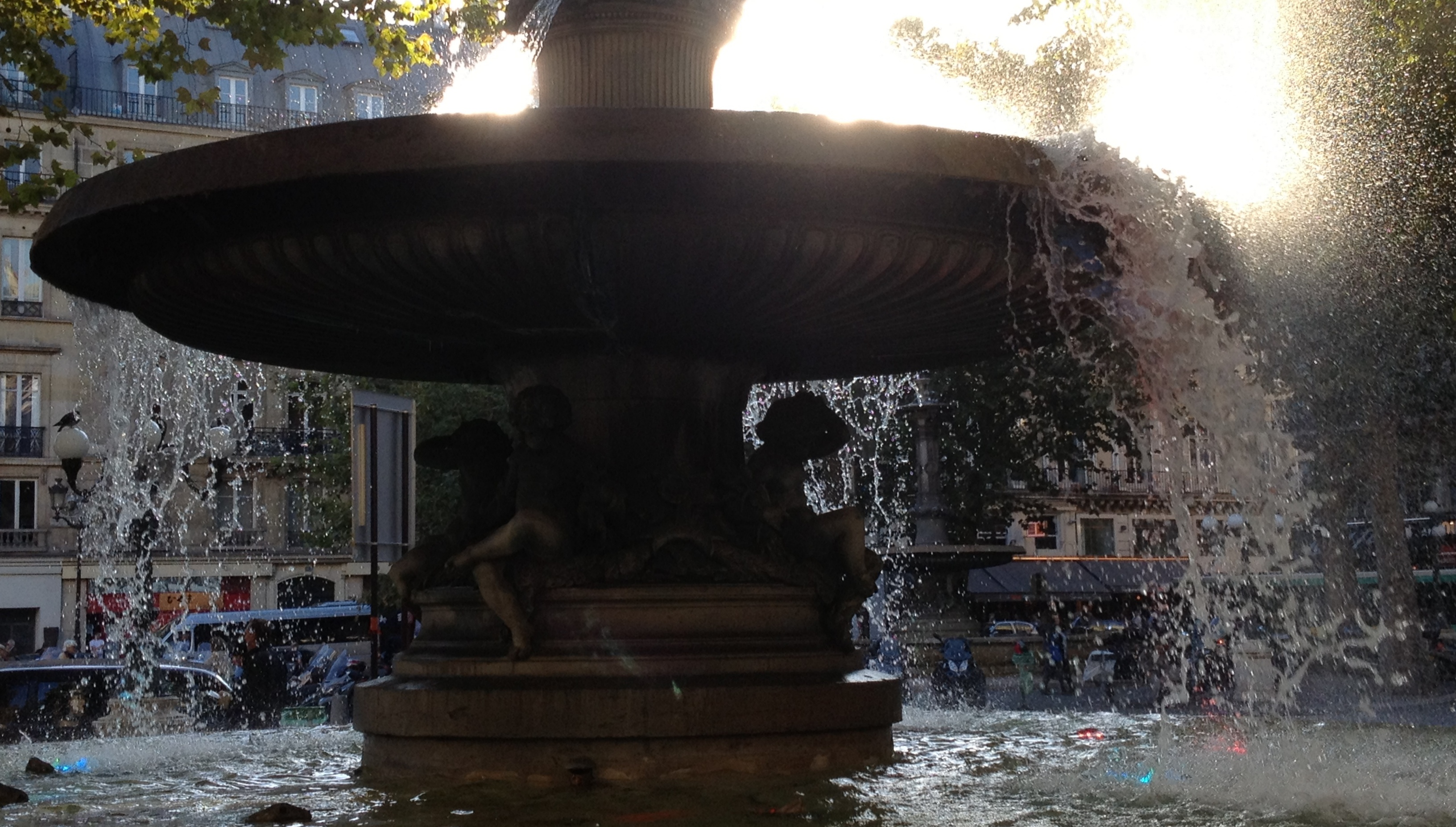
One of the generous fountains of Place André Malraux.

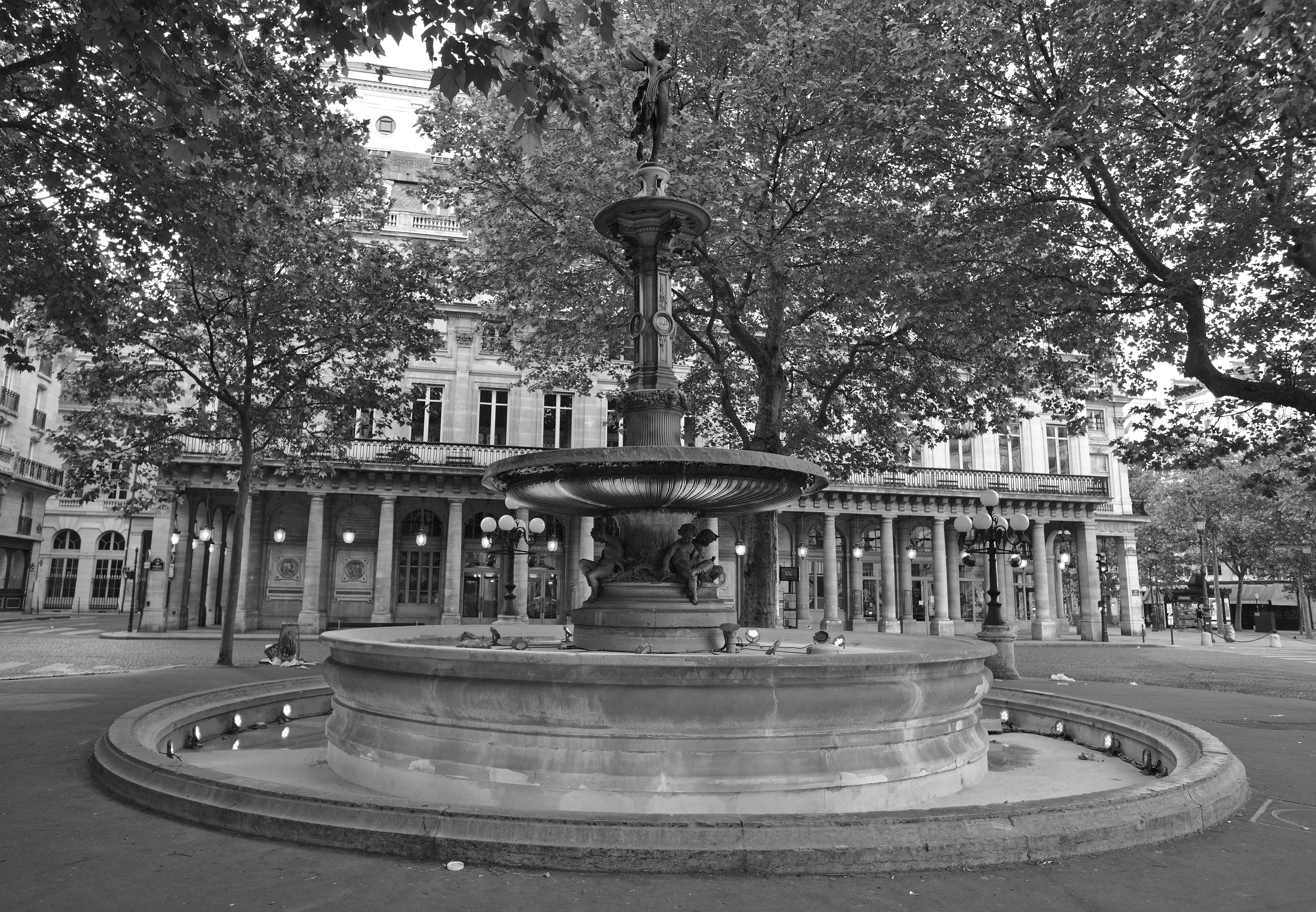
The easternmost fountain, topped with Nymph fluviale ('Nymph of the river'), an 1874 work by Mathurin Moreau (1822-1912).

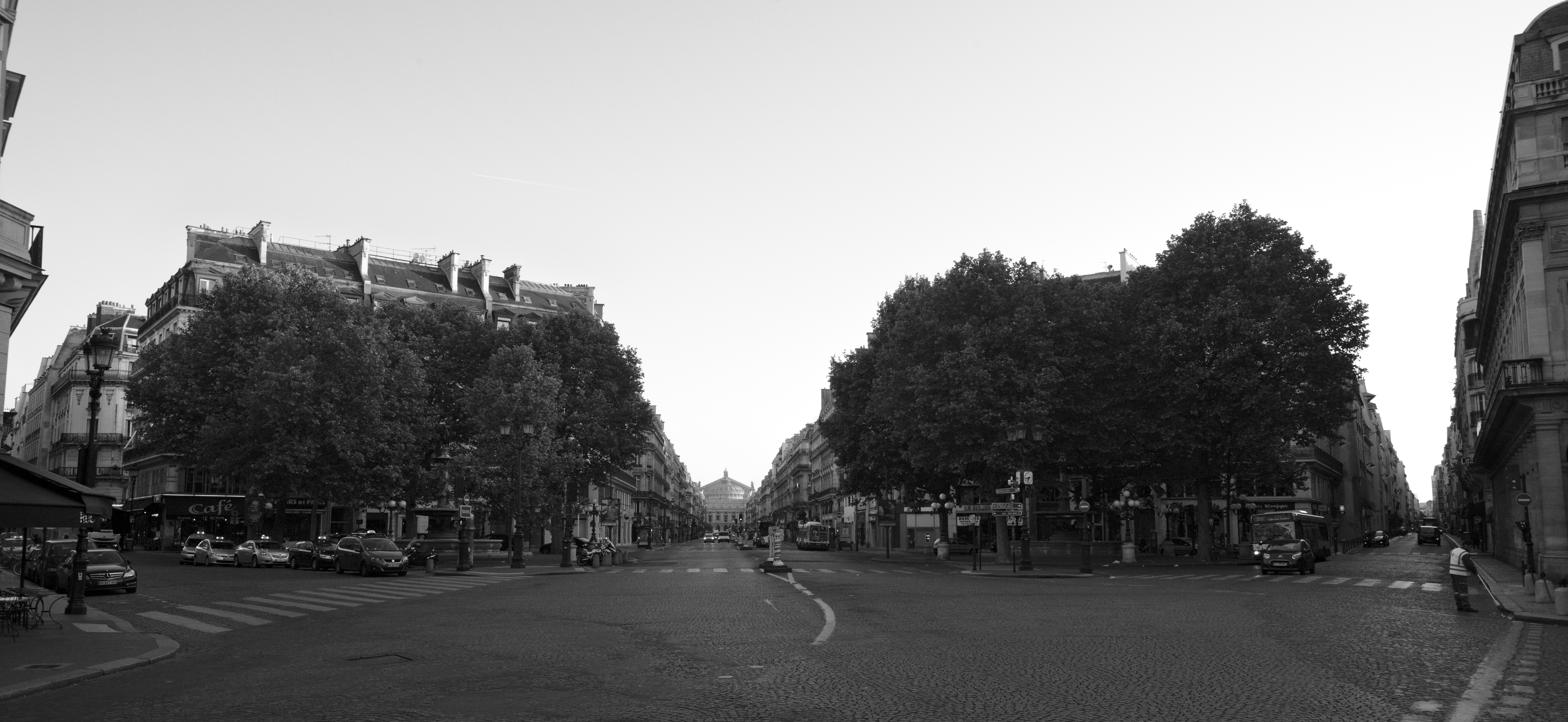
Place André Malraux showing the two fountains.

Davioud built this fountain in the new place, created in 1867, which marked the beginning of the new avenue de l'Opéra, which connected the city's most famous theater with the opera house. The project was begun in 1867, but was interrupted by the war and not finished until 1874.

According to Davioud's plan, two fountains were built. Each has a circular stone basin; a base of gray marble with four seated children in bronze; a bronze vasque; a piédouche, or column, of white marble with medallions with the seal of city, and water spouting from the top; and, at the top of the Piedouche, a river nymph at the top of the fountain nearest the theater, and a sea nymph at the top of the second fountain. The sea nymph sculpture is by Albert-Ernest Carrier-Belleuse and the four children at the base by Louis-Adolphe Eude; the river nymph was made by Mathurin Moreau, and the four children at the base by Charles Gauthier.

- Wallace fountain. In 1872 a British millionaire, temperance advocate and philanthropist, Sir Richard Wallace, who had spent much of his youth in Paris and had lived there during the 1870 war, recognizing the difficulty and cost of finding drinking water in Paris after the 1870 war, and following a program he had already begun in London, donated fifty cast-iron drinking fountains to the city of Paris. The sculptor of the fountains was Charles-Auguste Lebourg, a student of François Rude. He designed two models, one free-standing and the other to be attached to a wall, and in 1881, added a third, simpler version. The fountains were a popular success, and new ones were still being installed until the beginning of the First World War.
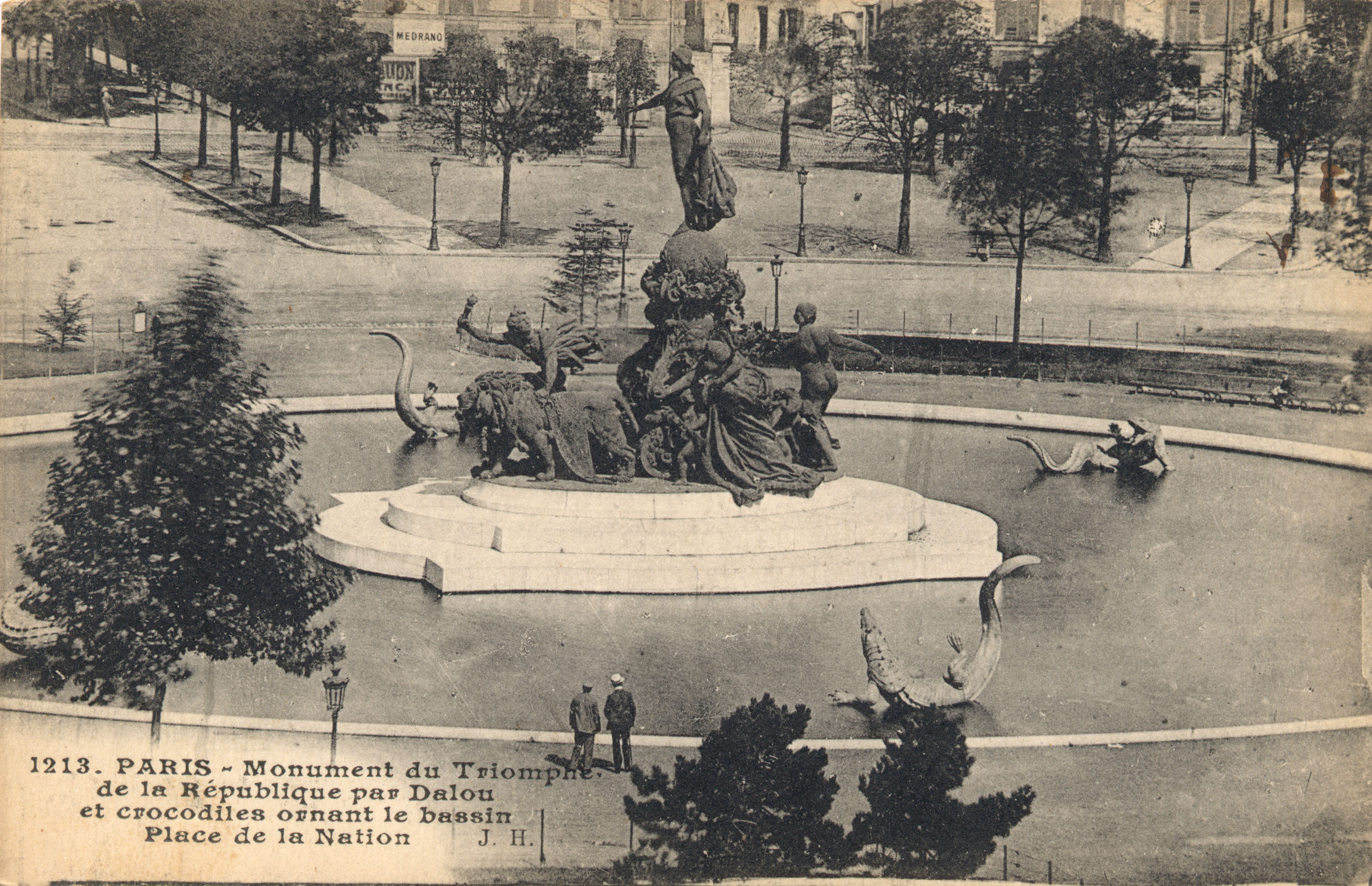
Triomphe de la Republique (1899), by Jules Dalou, in Place de la Nation. (1899) The basin was demolished in the 1960s to make room for the RER, but the statues from the fountain are still there.

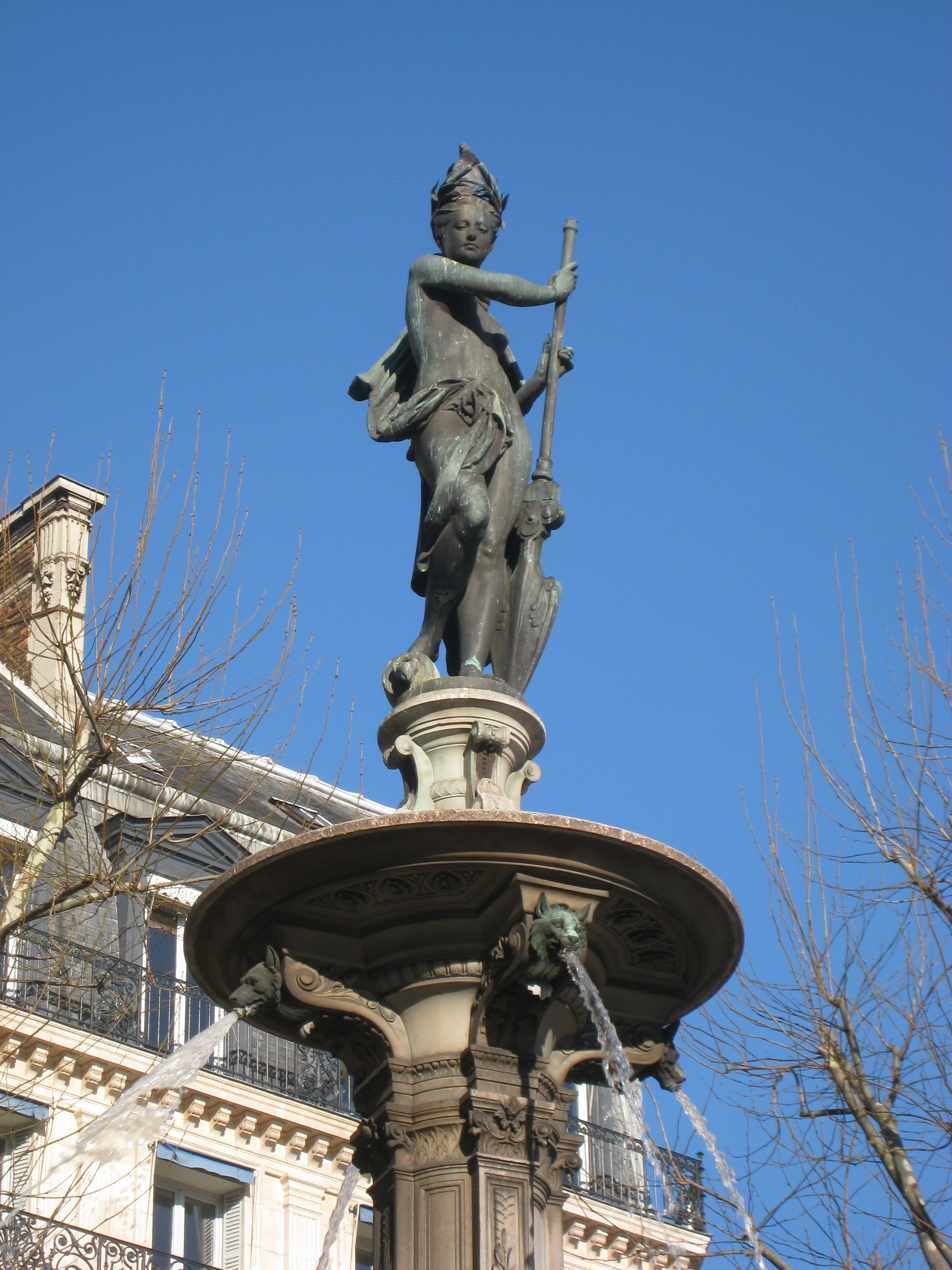
Fontaine Place André Malraux, formerly place du Théâtre Français, (1867-1874), Gabriel Davioud, architect.

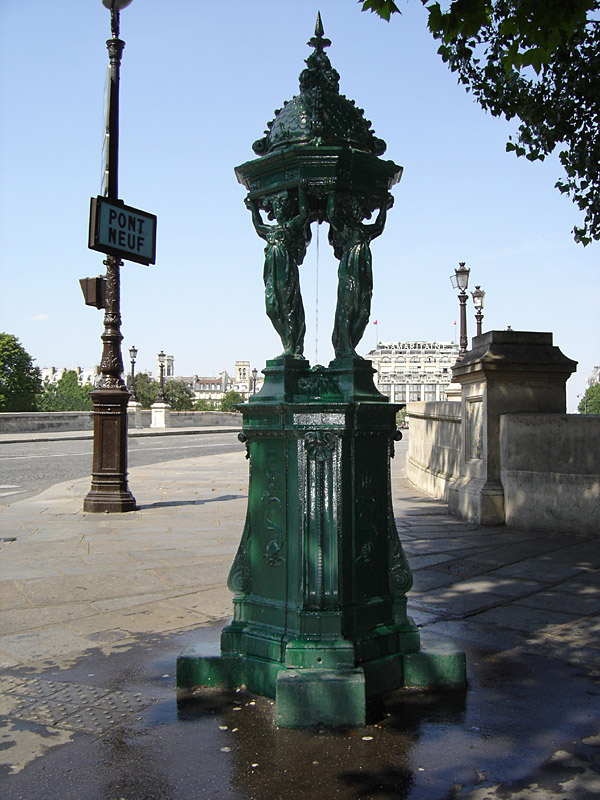
A Wallace fountain, Pont Neuf, (1872), one of 66 such cast-iron fountains placed around Paris by British industrialist and temperance activist Sir Richard Wallace.

== Paris Exposition Fountains (1855-1937) ==
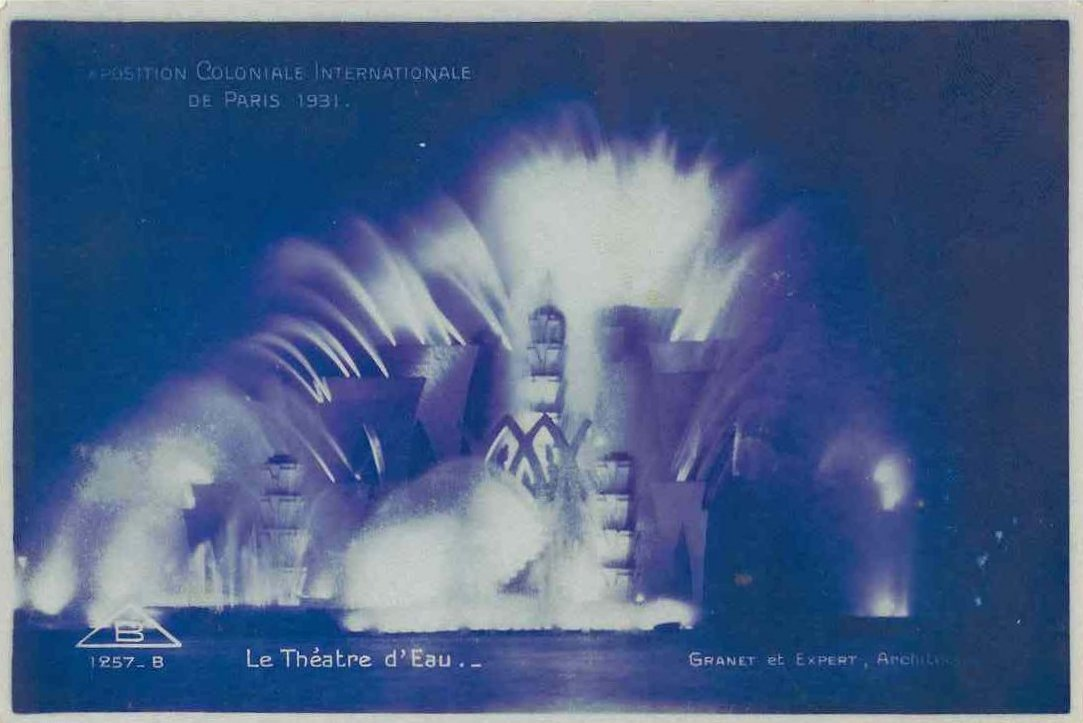
The "'Theatre d'eau" from the 1931 Colonial Exposition presented a performance of dancing water, changing shape and color. It was the ancestor of the modern musical fountain.

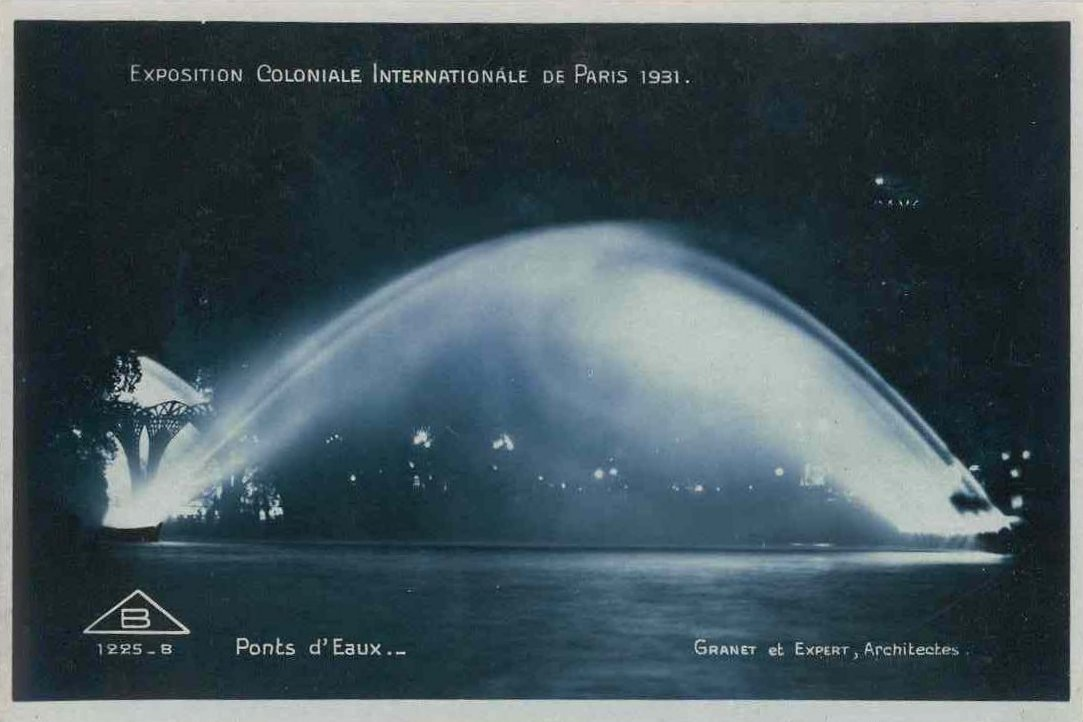
The "Pont d'eau' from the 1931 Paris Colonial Exhibit, a "bridge" of water over Lake Daumesnil forty meters long and six meters wide. This was the first fountain purely composed of water, with no architectural element, the ancestor of the Jet d'eau in Geneva created twenty years later.

Eight universal expositions took place in Paris between 1855 and 1937, and each included fountains, both for decoration and for sale, which demonstrated the latest in technology and artistic styles. They introduced illuminated fountains, fountains which performed with music, fountains made of glass and concrete, and modern abstract fountains to Paris.

The first such exposition, organized in 1855 by Louis Napoleon in response to the huge success of the Universal Exposition in London in 1851, displayed cast-iron fountains, on the model of the Fontaine to Louvois of Visconti, which could be purchased by any town or city.

- The Exposition Universelle of 1867 took place in the Champs-de-Mars and across the river at the Trocadero. For the Exposition, Baron Haussmann created a large basin, filled with water pumped by the Seine, to be used for fountains. Artificial rocks and grottos were built in the Champs-de-Mars, with cascading water, ponds and streams. Two monumental fountains were also built, at each end of the Pont d'Iéna, which was the ceremonial entrance of the exhibit. The most spectacular fountain in the exhibit was a crystal fountain, 7.3 meters high, with two vasques 3.1 meters in diameter, made by the firm of Baccarat. Only drawings remain of the crystal fountain.
- The Exposition Universelle of 1878. For this exposition, the first held during the new Third Republic, a château d'eau with a grotto, upper basin and fountains, a series of cascades, and a lower basin with fountains were built on the slopes of Chaillot, at the foot of the Palais du Trocadero, at the present site of the fountains of the Trocadero. The basins were surrounded by six gilded cast iron sculptures of animals representing the six continents. (These statues are now located on the parvis of the Musée d'Orsay.).
- The Exposition Universelle of 1889 celebrated the 100th anniversary of the French Revolution. Its most memorable feature was the Eiffel Tower, and it took place, like the previous exhibit, on the Champs-de-Mars and the Trocadero. A highlight of the exposition was a fountain illuminated by electric lights shining up though the columns of water, a method first developed in England in 1884. The fountains, located in a basin forty meters in diameter, were given color by plates of colored glass inserted over the lamps. The Fountain of Progress gave its show three times each evening, for twenty minutes, with a series of different colors. The system was primitive; it could only illuminate the water up to a height of four meters - but the effect was new and dramatic and extremely popular.
- The Exposition Universelle of 1900 was held both at the Champs-de-Mars and next to the Champs-Élysées, where a Grand and Petit Palais were constructed. One of its most popular features was the Temple of Electricity, near the Champs-Élysées, which had a series of illuminated fountains in front, with lamps shining blue, white and red light. The innovation of 1900 was a keyboard which allowed a rapid series of different colors. But by 1900 electricity was no longer a novelty, and the lighted fountains did not have the same effect that they did in 1889. It was agreed by critics that something new was needed for the 20th century fountain.
- The Exposition Internationale of 1925. This exhibit introduced the first fountains made of modern materials and in the modernist aret styles of the 20th century. The fountain by sculptor Gabriel Guevrekian was composed of four triangular basins, colored blue or red, and a fountain of glass in the center, surrounded by triangles of grass and flowers. It was the first fountain in Paris composed like a cubist painting.

The most original fountain in the exposition was Les Sources et les Rivieres of France, made by René Lalique. It was a column of glass five meters high, made up of 128 caryatids of glass, each with a different decoration and size, each spraying a thin stream of water into the fountain below. At night the column was illuminated from within, and could change color. It was placed on a cross of concrete covered with decorated plates of glass, and in an octagonal basin also decorated with colored and black tiles of glass.

- 'Colonial Exposition of 1931. This exhibit, designed to showcase France's overseas empire, was held in the eastern part of Paris, at the edge of the Bois de Vincennes, and it expressed two themes; the exoticism of France's distant colonies, and the modernism of France. New technologies shown at the exhibit included neon lights, indirect lighting of building facades (tested on Notre Dame Cathedral, the Place de la Concorde, and the Arc de Triomphe,) and eight monumental modern illuminated fountains.
- The cactus was a metal structure 17 meters high and 16 meters in diameter, with a dozen long branches reaching from the top the ground. Water poured from the top down the branches, and jetted out from the branches to the basin below. The whole structure was illuminated with white light.
- The Théâtre d'eau, or water theater, located on one side of the lake, covering an arc of a circle of about 80 meters, created a performance of dancing water, forming changing bouquets, arches, and curtains of water from its jets and nozzles. It was the ancestor of the modern musical fountain.
- The pont d'eau was made by jets of water from both sides of Lake Daumesnil, which formed an illuminated water "bridge" forty meters long and six meters wide. This was the first fountain made entirely of water, with no architectural element; the ancestor of the Jet d'eau in Lake Geneva, created twenty years later.
- The Exposition Internationale of 1937, the last exhibit of its kind, was held at the Trocadero and the Champs-de-Mars, and once again the fountains were the highlight. Water jets were placed on both sides of the Seine, with a range of 25 meters, and 174 other fountains placed under the surface of the river. The choreography of the fountains was combined with light, and, for the first time, with music, amplified from eleven rafts with loudspeakers in the river. The music featured compositions by the leading modern composers of the period, including Igor Stravinsky, Darius Milhaud, and Arthur Honegger.

The cascades, fountains and basins of the Trocadero, built for the 1878 exposition, were completely rebuilt for the 1937 exposition. Two monumental statues, Apollon by Henri Bouchard and Hercule by Albert Pommier, were placed on the esplendade above the fountains. The main feature was a long basin, or water mirror, with twelve fountain creating columns of water 12 meters high; twenty four smaller fountains four meters high; and ten arches of water. At one end, facing the Seine, were twenty powerful water cannon, able to project a jet of water fifty meters. Above the long basin were two smaller basins, linked with the lower basin by cascades flanked by 32 sprays of water four meter high, in vasques. These fountains are the only exposition fountains which still exist today, and still function as they did.

The exhibit also featured two more unusual fountains; a fountain in the Spanish pavilion by Alexander Calder, the Fontaine de Mercure, where a small metal structure created a flow of mercury, and a fountain of wine, imitating one once created for Louis XIV at Versailles.

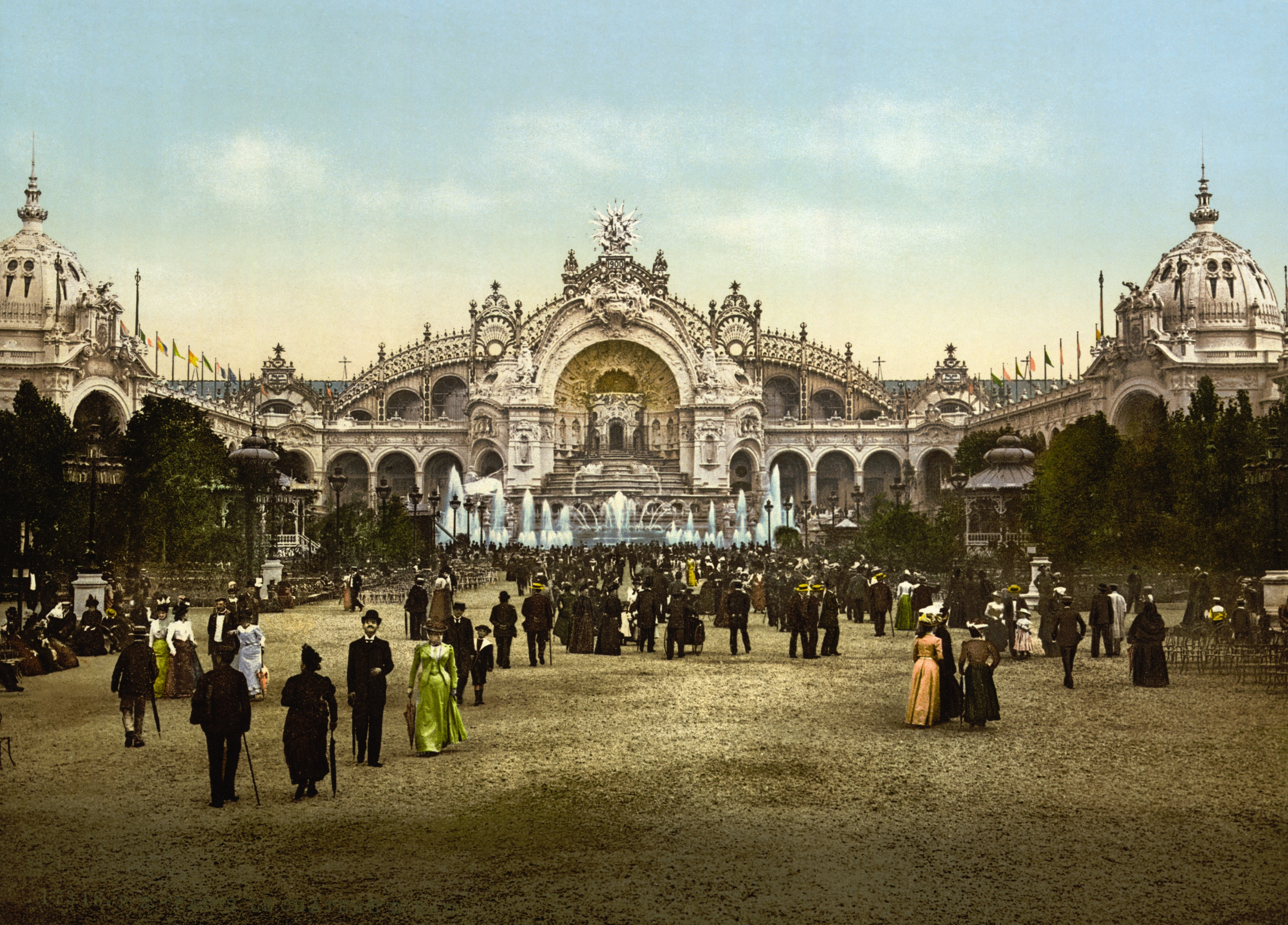
The Chateau d'eau and plaza of the Paris Universal Exposition of 1900, which stood near today's Grand Palais. The fountains were illuminated with different colors at night, but by 1900 electricity was no longer a novelty.

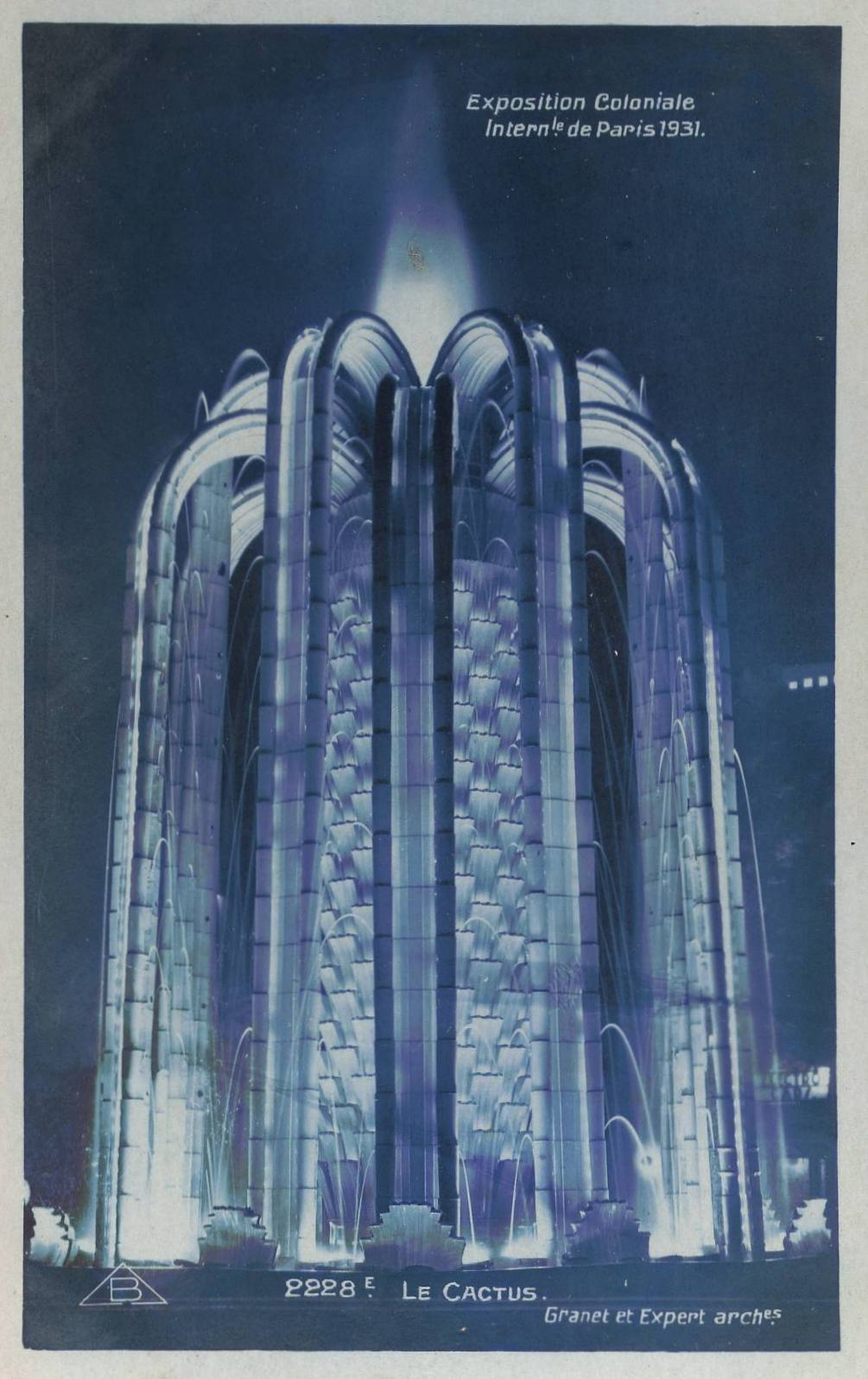
The monumental fountain 'Cactus' from the 1931 Paris Colonial Exposition was 17 meters high, with water descending through twelve branches which each spouted water.

== Paris Fountains (1900–1945) ==
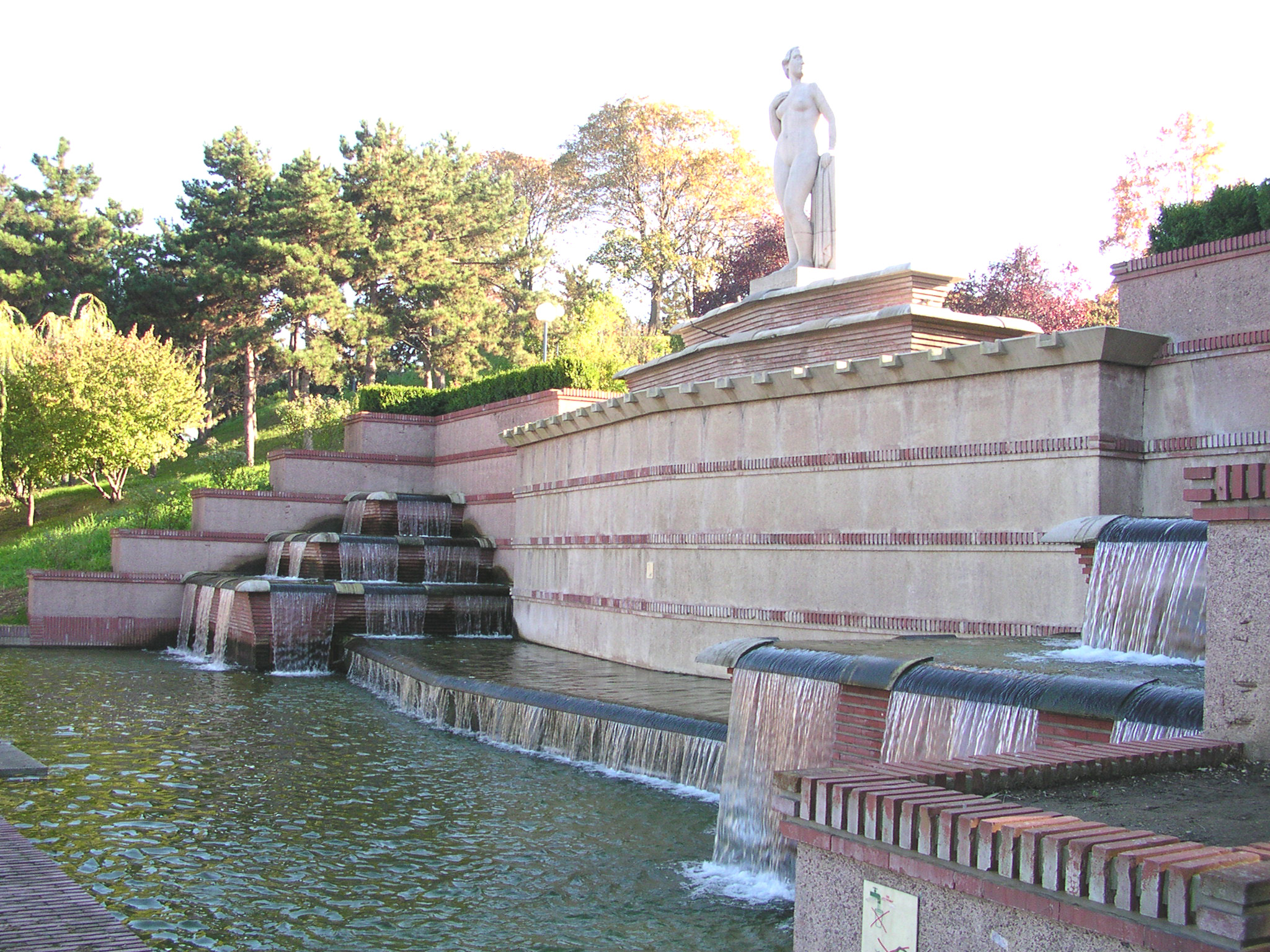
L'accueil de Paris, Femme au bain. Square de la Butte-du-Chapeau Rouge. 1938. Raymond Couvegnes, architect, Léon Azéma.(1938). The fountain was built to display the statue, which had been featured at the 1937 Paris exposition.

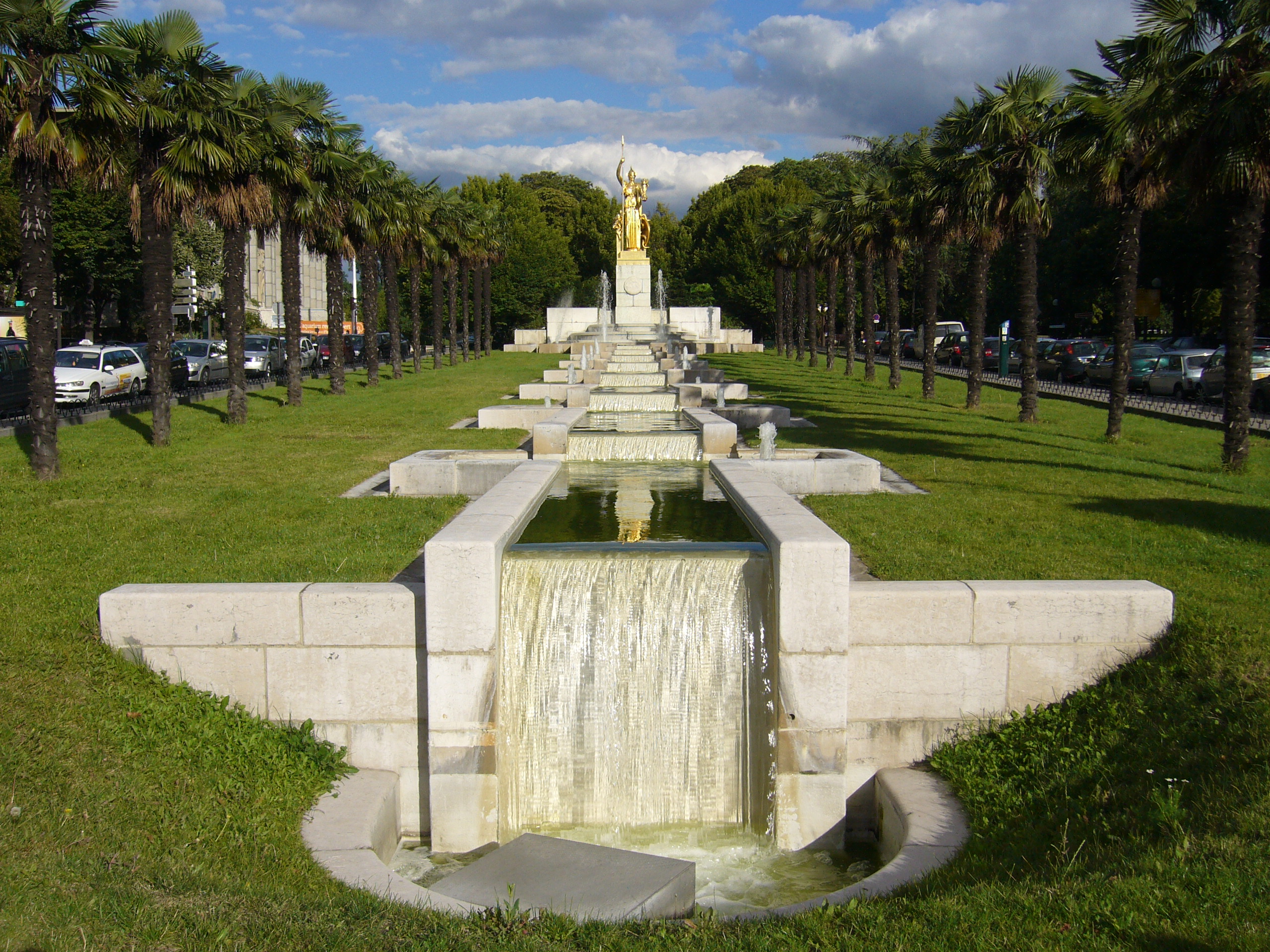
Fontaine de la Port Dorée, Place Edouard-Renard, 12th arrondissement (1935.) Louis Madeleine, architect, Leon Drivier, sculptor.

Paris fountains in the 20th century no longer had to supply drinking water - they were purely decorative; and, since their water usually came from the river and not from the city adqueducts, their water was no longer drinkable. Twenty-eight new fountains were built in Paris between 1900 and 1940; nine new fountains between 1900 and 1910; four between 1920 and 1930; and fifteen between 1930 and 1940.

The removal of the ring of fortifications around Paris created space for many new parks and squares. Most of the new fountains were located in parks and other green spaces, and most were modest in scale.

The biggest fountains of the period were those built for the International Expositions of 1900, 1925 and 1937, and for the Colonial Exposition of 1931. Of those, only the fountains from the 1937 exposition at the Palais de Chaillot still exist. (See section above on Exposition fountains.)

The form of the classic Paris fountain of the 19th century, with a single or double circular vasque, nearly vanished during the 20th century. replaced by a wide variety of styles and new materials. They ranged from neo-classical styles to a glass fountain made by René Lalique for the Rond-Point des Champs-Élysées (no longer existing). Several fountains were created to showcase statues made for other purposes, such as the statue "France brings peace and prosperity to the colonies", by sculptor Leon Drivier, originally atop the Palace of Colonies of the 1931 Colonial Exposition, which, after the exhibit closed, was moved to be the centerpiece of a new fountain, the Fontaine de Madeline, in place Eduouard Renard.

The subject matter of the new fountains also varied widely: there is a fountain honoring composer Claude Debussy (The Fontaine Debussy, Place Debussy, 1932); a fountain honoring the engineer who discovered the first artesian well in Paris (The Fontaine George Mulot, on the location of the first artesian well on Rue Grenelle): a fountain for writer Leo Tolstoy; a fountain honoring Emile Lavassor, the driver who won first Paris-Bordeaux automobile race in 1895; (Fontaine Lavassor, Porte Maillot; and two fountains in the 16th arrondissement devoted to love; the Fontaine des Amours in the Bagatelle garden (1919) and the Fountain de l'Amour, l'Eveil a la vie. (the awakening of life) in Place de la Porte d'Auteil.

The notable fountains of the pre-war period include, in chronological order:

- Fontaine Levassor, Porte Maillot, 16th arrondissement ((1907). Jules Daulou and Lefevre, sculptors. The fountain honors émile Levassor, the winner of the 1895 Paris to Bordeaux automobile race, and is the only fountain in Paris with a bas-relief of an automobile.
- Fontaine des Amours de Bagatelle, Parc-de-Batagelle, 16th arrondissement, (1919). Raymond Sudre, sculptor.
- The Chateau d'eau in Place Jean-Baptiste-Clemente at the foot of the butte of Montmartre, 18th arrondissement (1932.) Paul Gasq, sculptor.
- The Fontaine Debussy, in Square Debussy. 16th arrondissement (1932), by sculptors Jan and Joel Martel, and Jean Burkhalter, architect.
- Fontaine Tolstoi, Square Leon Tolstoi, 16th arrondissement (1934). Cassou, sculptor.
- Fontaine de la Porte Dorée, Place Edouard-Renard, 12th arrondissement (1935). Sculpture by Leon Drivier, Louis Madeline, architect. The fountain was built to showcase the statue, France the Colonizer, which had stood at the entrance of the Paris Colonial Exposition of 1931.
- Fontaine Steinlen, Square Constantin-Pecquier, 18th arrondissement (1936). Paul Vannier, sculptor.
- The Fontaines de la Porte de Saint-Cloud, Place Port de Saint-Cloud, 16th arrondissement (1936). Paul Landowski, sculptor, and Robert Pommier and Jacques Billiard, architects. The monumental fountains were made to fill a vast square created in 1926 for a tramway and railway station and meeting point of seven avenues, where the old gates and fortifications of the city had been. The central features were two cylindrical columns, fifteen meters high, spouting water and covered with bas-reliefs, and illuminated at night, designed to serve as a symbolic entrance to the city. Their creator, the sculptor Paul Landowski, wrote, "these are the first fountains in Paris in which the effects of light, architecture and sculpture were joined from the very beginning."
- Fontaines de Trocadéro and Fontaines de Varsovie on the Esplenade and in the gardens of the Palais de Trocadéro, (1937), built for the 1937 International Exposition. (see Exposition Fountains above.) The pumping room under the fountain basin was renovated between 2010 and 2011, and the fountain fully functions as it previously did.
- L'Accueil de Paris, Femme au Bain in Square de la Butte-du-Chapeau-Rouge, 19th arrondissement (1938.) The architect was Léon Azéma, city architect, who created a series of new squares and parks where the old city fortifications had been. The sculpture, by Raymond Couvegnes, had been featured at the 1937 International Exposition.

== Paris fountains (1945-2000) ==
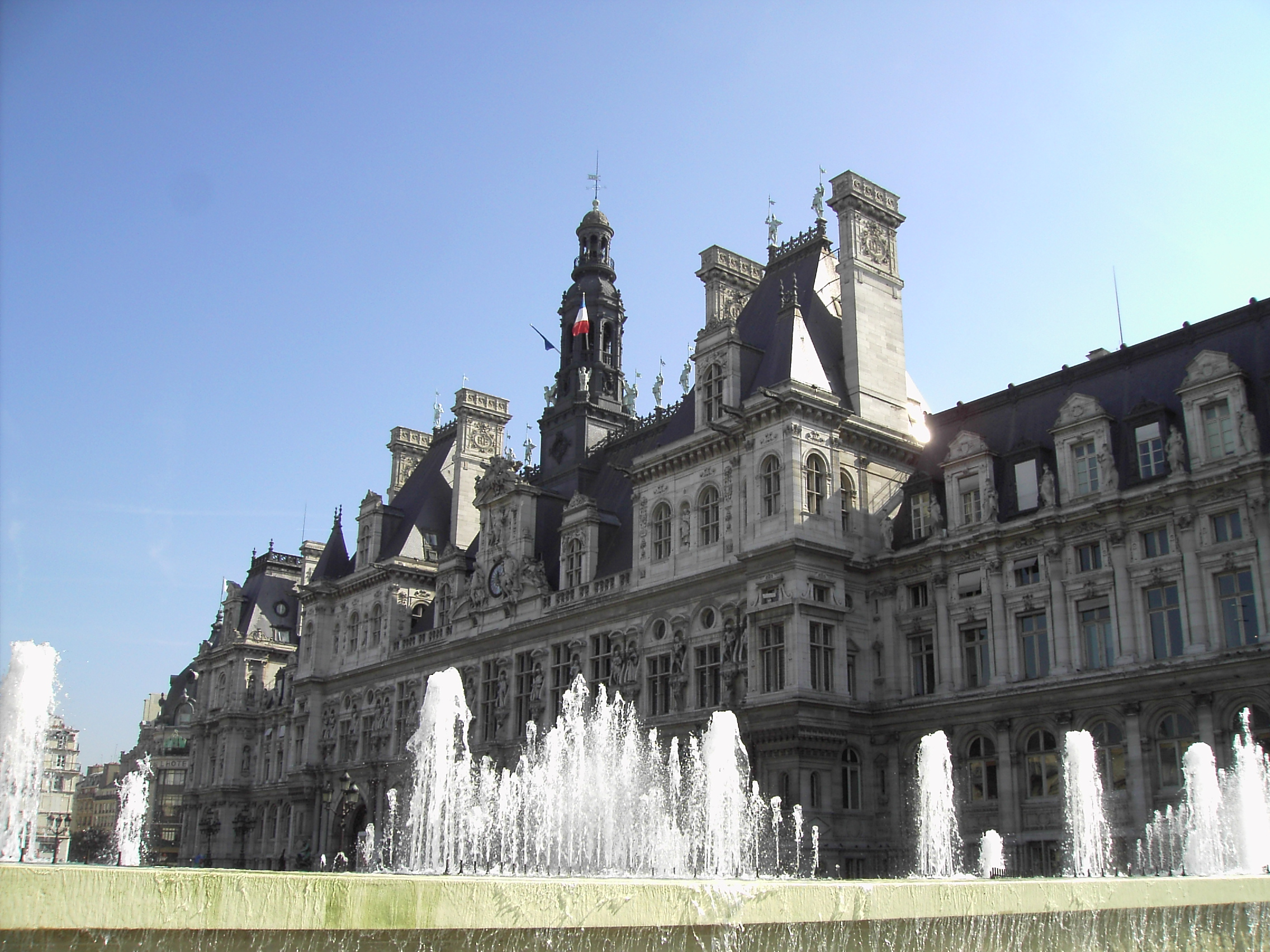
The Fontaine de l'Hôtel de Ville, Place de l'Hôtel de Ville, (1983), François-Xavier Lalanne, sculptor.

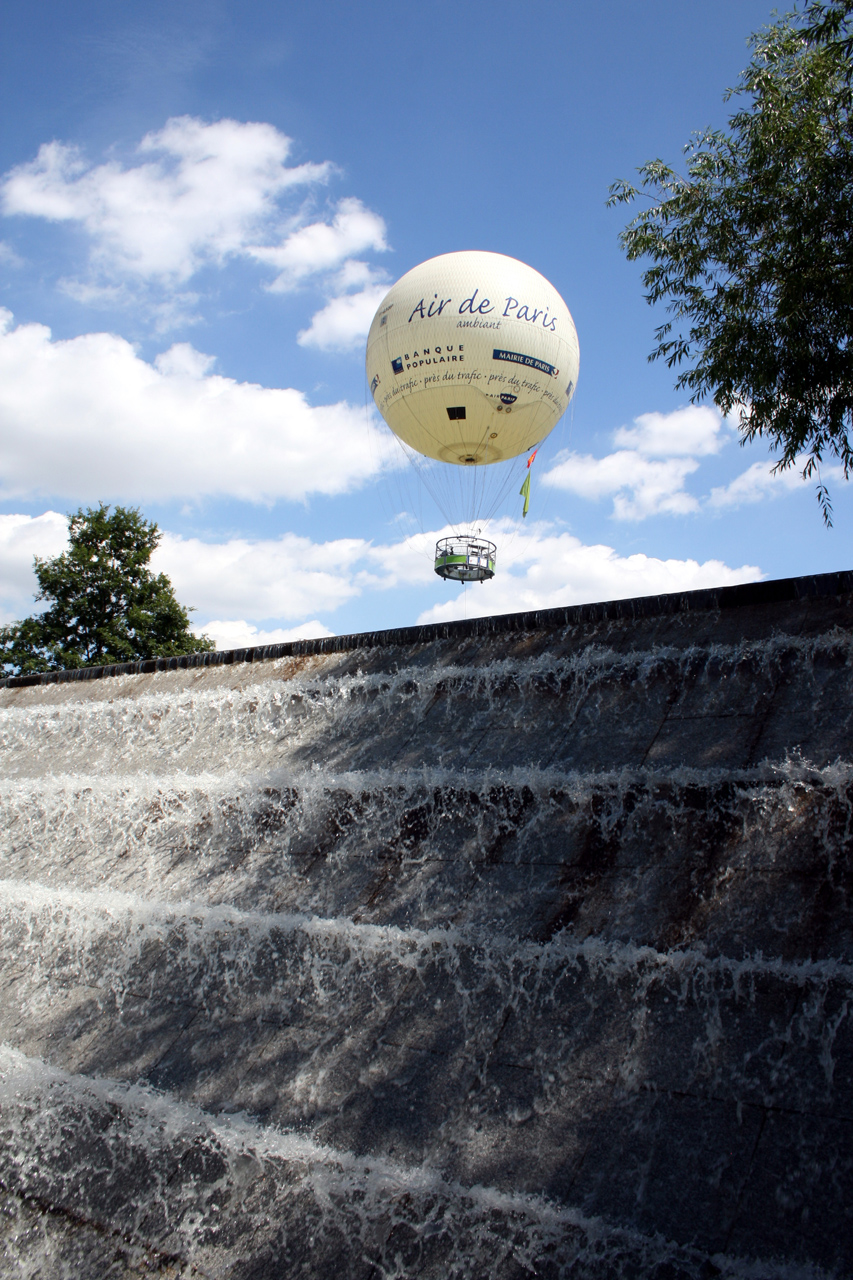
Cascade, Parc André Citroen, (1992)

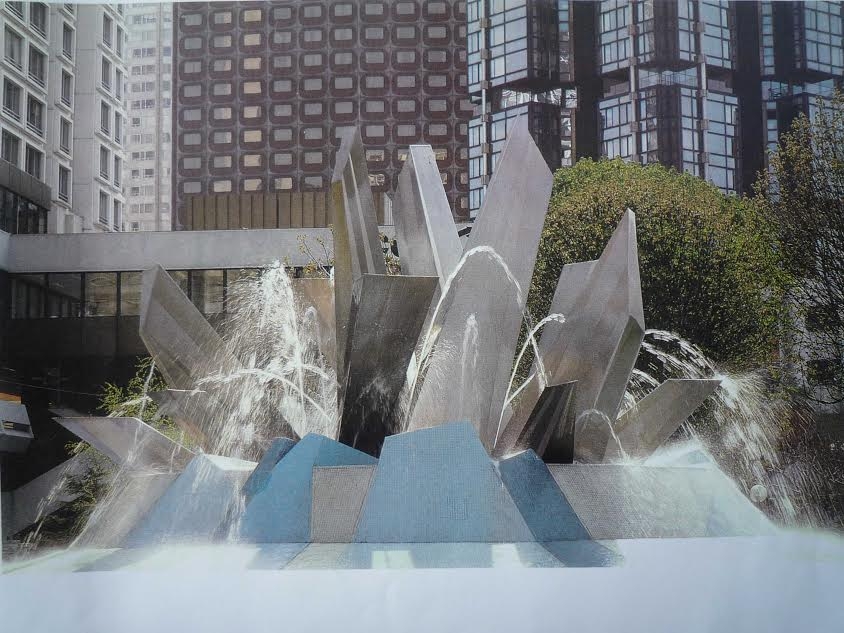
Cristaux. Jean-Yves Lechevallier

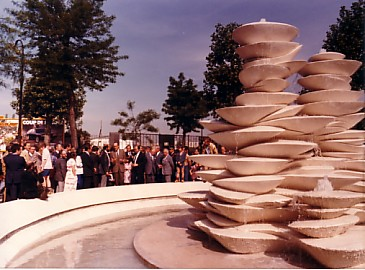
Polypores Fountain. Jean-Yves Lechevallier

Only a handful of fountains were built in Paris between 1940 and 1980. The most important ones built during that period were on the edges of the city, on the west, just outside the city limits, at La Defense, and to the east at the Bois de Vincennes.

Between 1981 and 1995, during the terms of President François Mitterrand and Culture Minister Jack Lang, and of Mitterrand's bitter political rival, Paris Mayor Jacques Chirac (Mayor from 1977 until 1995), the city experienced a program of monumental fountain building that exceeded that of Napoleon Bonaparte or Louis Philippe. More than one hundred fountains were built in Paris in the 1980s and 1990s, mostly in the neighbourhoods outside the centre of Paris, where there had been few fountains before. The Fountain Cristaux by Jean-Yves Lechevallier in the new Front de Seine district, the Stravinsky Fountain, the Fountain of the Pyramid of the Louvre, the Buren Fountain and Les Sphérades fountain in the Palais-Royal, the Fontaine du Parc Andre-Citroen, the Polypores fountain and new fountains at Les Halles, the Jardin de Reuilly, and beside the Gare Maine-Montparnasse were all built under President Mitterrand and Mayor Chirac.

The Mitterrand-Chirac fountains had no single style or theme. Many of the fountains were designed by famous sculptors or architects, such as Jean Tinguely, I.M. Pei, Claes Oldenburg and Daniel Buren, who had radically different ideas of what a fountain should be. Some of them, like the Pyramide de Louvre fountain, had glistening sheets of water; while in the Buren Fountain in the Palais-Royal, the water was invisible, hidden under the pavement of the fountain. Some of the new fountains were designed with the help of noted landscape architects and used natural materials, such as the fountain in the Parc Floral in the Bois de Vincennes by landscape architect Daniel Collin and sculptor François Stahly. Some were solemn, and others were whimsical. Most made little effort to blend with their surroundings - they were designed to attract attention.

President Mitterrand and Culture Minister Lang were closely involved in many of the projects they commissioned. Mitterrand personally selected the architect of the Louvre project, and Lang negotiated the design of the Stravinsky Fountain with the sculptors, reducing the number of colorful "nanas" by Niki de Saint-Phalle from two to one.

Many of the fountains were built thanks to a change in the law for public financing of works of art, which required that one percent of the budget for the construction of a public building in Paris be devoted to artistic decoration. This law, originally passed in the 1930s, was extended in the 1980s so that the funding could be used to build art works in the squares and other public areas around the new building. The law was also amended so that the one percent applied to the Grand Projects of the Head of State, which allowed the construction of the fountains near the Pyramid of the Louvre. A special fund, called the Le Fonds de la Commande Publique de l'État, was established to fund new works by living artists. This fund paid for the Daniel Buren fountain in the courtyard of the Palais Royale, and the 'Bicyclettte ensevelie" by Claes Oldenburg and Coosje van Bruggen, and Horloges by the sculptor Arman, located in the Park of the Cite of Sciencds and Industry at La Villette.

Several new parks were constructed during this period with fountains as their centrepieces. These included the Parc de Belleville (1988), the historic source of the Paris water supply since the 12th century, where a new park was built, with a flowing stream, cascades, and water stairways, along with two basins with jetting fountains; and Parc André Citroën (1992), on the banks of the Seine in the 15th arrondissement, on the site of the former automobile factory, where a series of thematic gardens were created by architects Patrick Berger, Jean-Paul Viguier and Jean-François Joddry and landscape architects Alain Provost and Gilles Clément. These different fountains shaped water into columns, mirrors and canals, decorated with modern versions of classical peristyles and nympheums.

The old produce markets of Paris, Les Halles, were the site of another new garden with fountains (1988) by architect Louis Arretche, Jean Willerval Pierre Mougin.

The Jardins de Reuilly (1992) by Pierre Colboc, were built along the Avenue Daumesnil. with water shaped into canals along the pedestrian paths, inspired by gardens in Andalusia.

A new park, the Jardin Atlantique, was built in 1994 on the concrete slab that covers the railway lines of the train station Gare Maine-Montparnasse. This included three modern fountains, the Fontaine des Humidités, the Fontaine des Miroitements, and Fontaine des Hespérides, by architects Christine Schnitzler and François Brun, along with landscape architect Michel Pena, which added water and greenery into an urban space surrounded by huge concrete buildings.

Other new fountains were highly original and personal visions of the artists who created them:

The Fontaine de l'Embacle (1984), in Place du Québec, across from the church of Saint-Germain-des-Prés, by the sculptor Daudelin and architect Alfred Gindre, represents a spring bursting through the pavement, pushing up the paving stones, and then pouring back into the earth.

The fountain called Canyoneaustrate (1988) in front of the Palais Omnisport at Bercy, by the sculptor Singer, shows a giant crevice in the earth, similar to the canyons of the American west, with water cascading down into the canyon to return to its source.

Deux Plateaux in the courtyard of the Palais-Royal by minimalist sculptor Daniel Buren, does not look like a fountain at all. A group of columns with black and white vertical stripes are arranged in a courtyard, and water flows beneath them, seen, except through a grill in the pavement, as if at the bottom of a well. It was attacked for its cost and unsuitability to a historic landmark. Lang, then the culture minister, paid no attention to the orders of the Commission des Monuments Historiques, which objected to the plan.

The largest of the new fountains was Le Creuset du temps (1988) by sculptor Shamai Haber, in the Place de Catalogne behind the Montparnasse train station. It features a gigantic disc, slightly inclined, covered with thousands of granite paving stones in concentric circles, over which water gently flows. This fountain was not maintained by the Paris city council and was not functional for more than a decade, before demolition of the fountain commenced in 2022, for it to be replaced with planters.

== Paris fountains since 2000 ==
Few new fountains have been built in Paris since 2000. The most notable is La Danse de la fontaine emergente, located on Place Augusta-Holmes, rue Paul Klee, in the 13th arrondissement. It was designed by the French-Chinese sculptor Chen Zhen, shortly before his death in 2000, and finished by his widow and collaborator Xu Min in 2008. It shows a dragon, in stainless steel, glass and plastic, emerging and submerging from the pavement of the square. Water under pressure flows through the transparent skin of the dragon.

== See also ==
- List of Paris fountains by arrondissement.

== Bibliography ==
- Paris et ses fontaines, de la Renaissance à nos jours, texts assembled by Dominque Massounie, Pauline-Prevost-Marcilhacy and Daniel Rabreau, Délegation a l'action artistique de la Ville de Paris. from the Collection Paris et son Patrimoine, directed by Beatrice de Andia. Paris, 1995.
- Yves-Marie Allain and Janine Christiany, L'art des jardins en Europe, Citadelles & Mazenod, Paris, 2006.
- Piganiol de La Force, Description historique de la Ville de Paris et de ses environs, Paris, 1745.
- A Duval, Les fontaines de Paris anciennes et nouvelles, Paris, 1812
- Hortense Lyon, La Fontaine Stravinsky, Collection Baccauréate arts plastiques 2004, Centre national de documentation pédagogique
