= Paris under Napoleon =

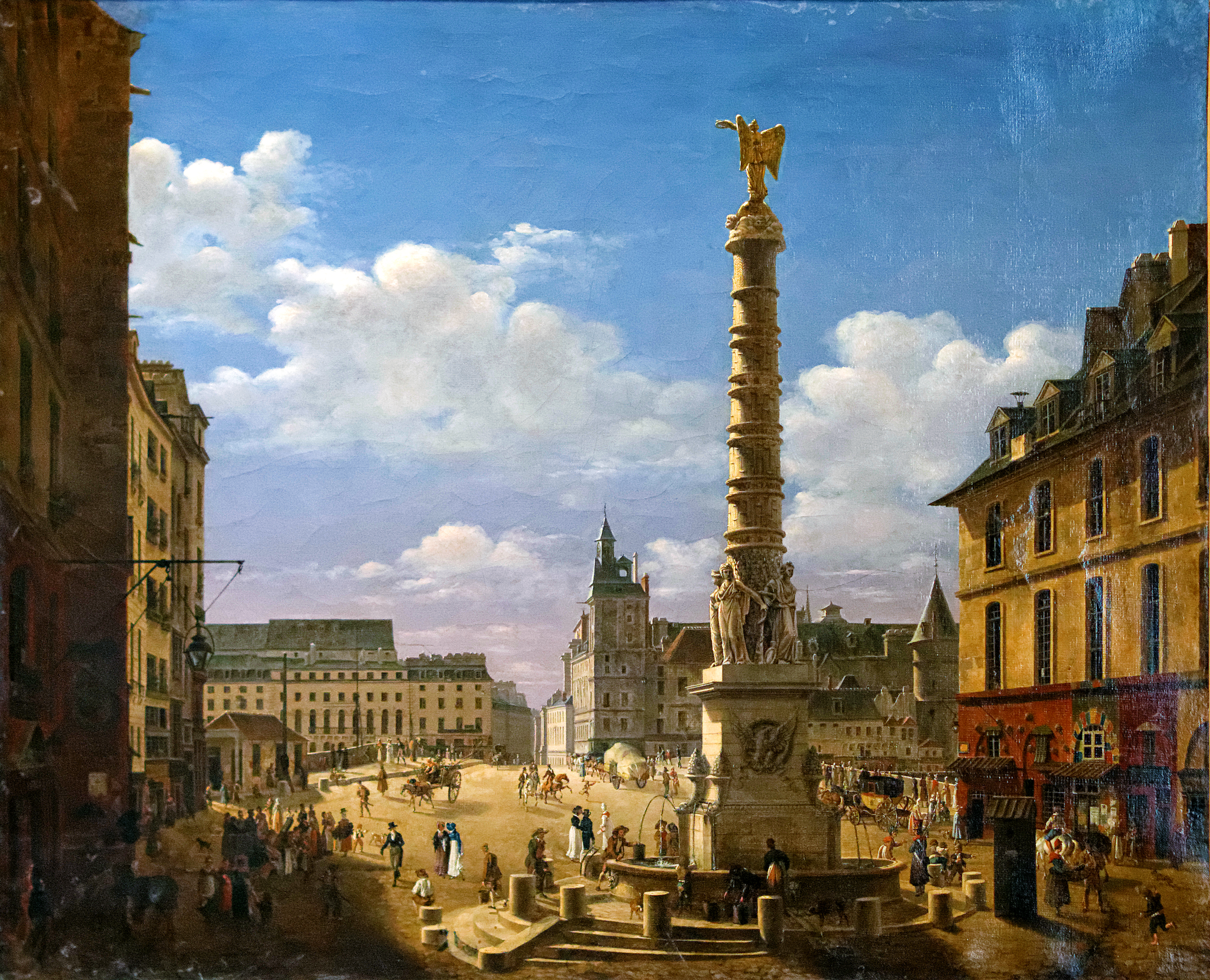
Place du Chatelet and the new Fontaine du Palmier, by Etienne Bouhot (1810)

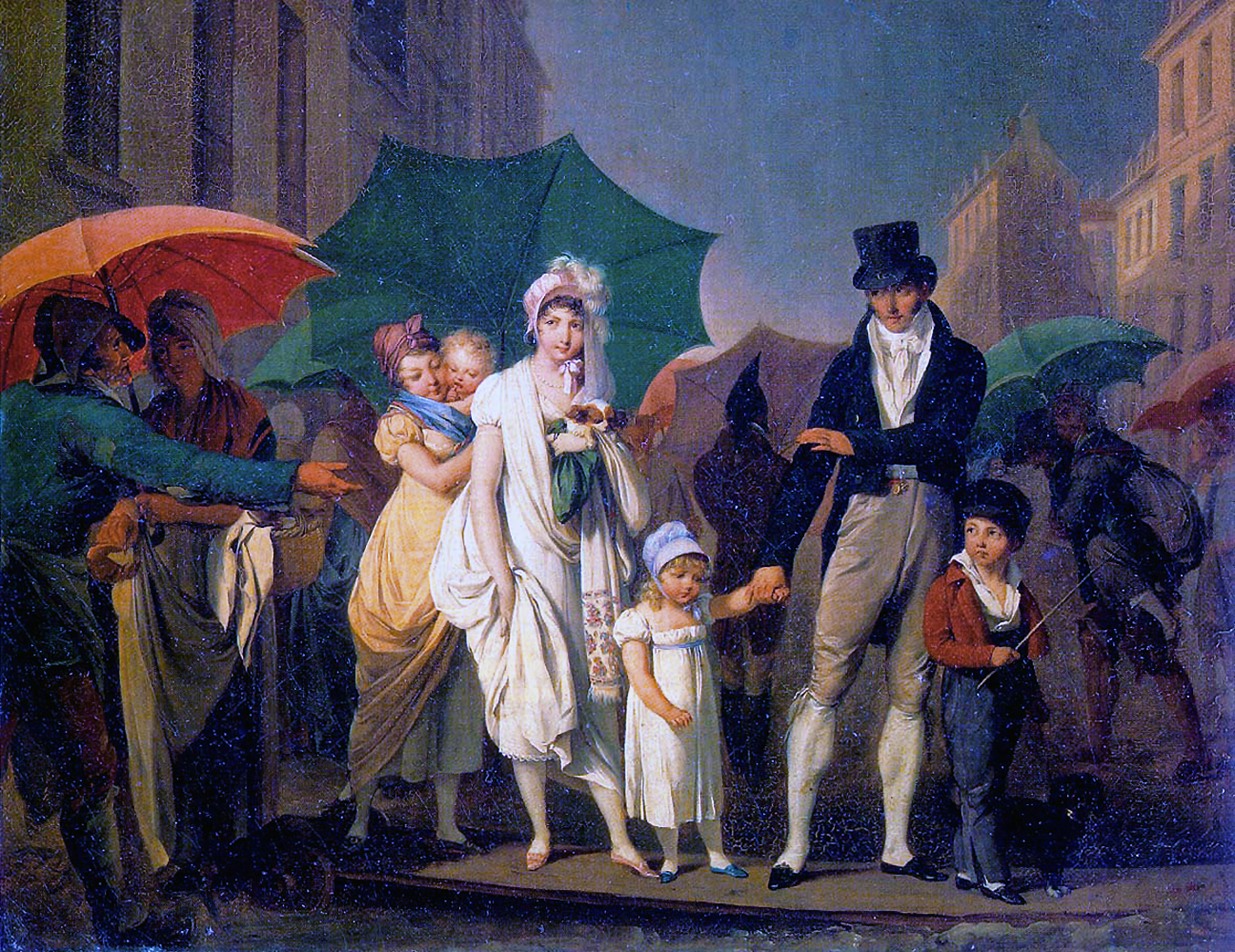
Family of Parisians trying to cross a muddy street in the rain (By Boilly, 1803)

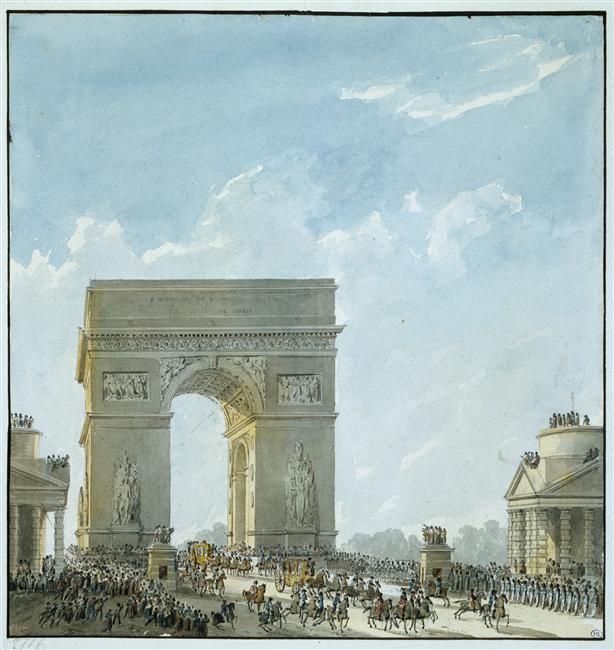
A wood and canvas version of the unfinished Arc de Triomphe was constructed for the entrance of Marie-Louise of Austria to Paris in 1810.

First Consul Napoleon Bonaparte moved into the Tuileries Palace on 19 February 1800 and immediately began to re-establish calm and order after the years of uncertainty and terror of the French Revolution. He made peace with the Catholic Church; masses were held again in the Cathedral of Notre Dame, priests were allowed to wear ecclesiastical clothing again, and churches to ring their bells. To re-establish order in the unruly city, Bonaparte abolished the elected position of the Mayor of Paris, and replaced it with a Prefect of the Seine and a Prefect of Police, both appointed by him. Each of the twelve arrondissements had its own mayor, but their power was limited to enforcing the decrees of Napoleon's ministers.

After he crowned himself Emperor on December 2, 1804, Napoleon began a series of projects to make Paris into an imperial capital to rival ancient Rome. He built monuments to French military glory, including the Arc de Triomphe du Carrousel, the column in Place Vendôme, and the future church of the Madeleine, intended as a temple to military heroes; and began the Arc de Triomphe. To improve the circulation of traffic in central Paris, he built a wide new street, Rue de Rivoli, from the Place de la Concorde to the Place des Pyramides. He made important improvements to the city's sewers and water supply, including a canal from the Ourcq River, and the construction of a dozen new fountains, including the Fontaine du Palmier on Place du Châtelet; and three new bridges; the Pont d'Iéna, Pont d'Austerlitz, including the Pont des Arts (1804), the first iron bridge in Paris. The Louvre became the Napoleon Museum, in a wing of the former palace, displaying many works of art he brought back from his military campaigns in Italy, Austria, Holland and Spain; and he militarized and re-organized the Grandes écoles, to train engineers and administrators.

Between 1801 and 1811, the population of Paris grew from 546,856 to 622,636, nearly the population before the French Revolution, and by 1817 it reached 713,966. During Napoleon's reign, Paris suffered from war and blockade, but retained its position as a European capital of fashion, art, science, education, and commerce. After his downfall in 1814, the city was occupied by the Prussian, English and German armies. The symbols of the monarchy were restored, but most of Napoleon's monuments and some of his new institutions, including the form of city government, the fire department, and the modernized Grandes écoles, survived.

== The Parisians ==
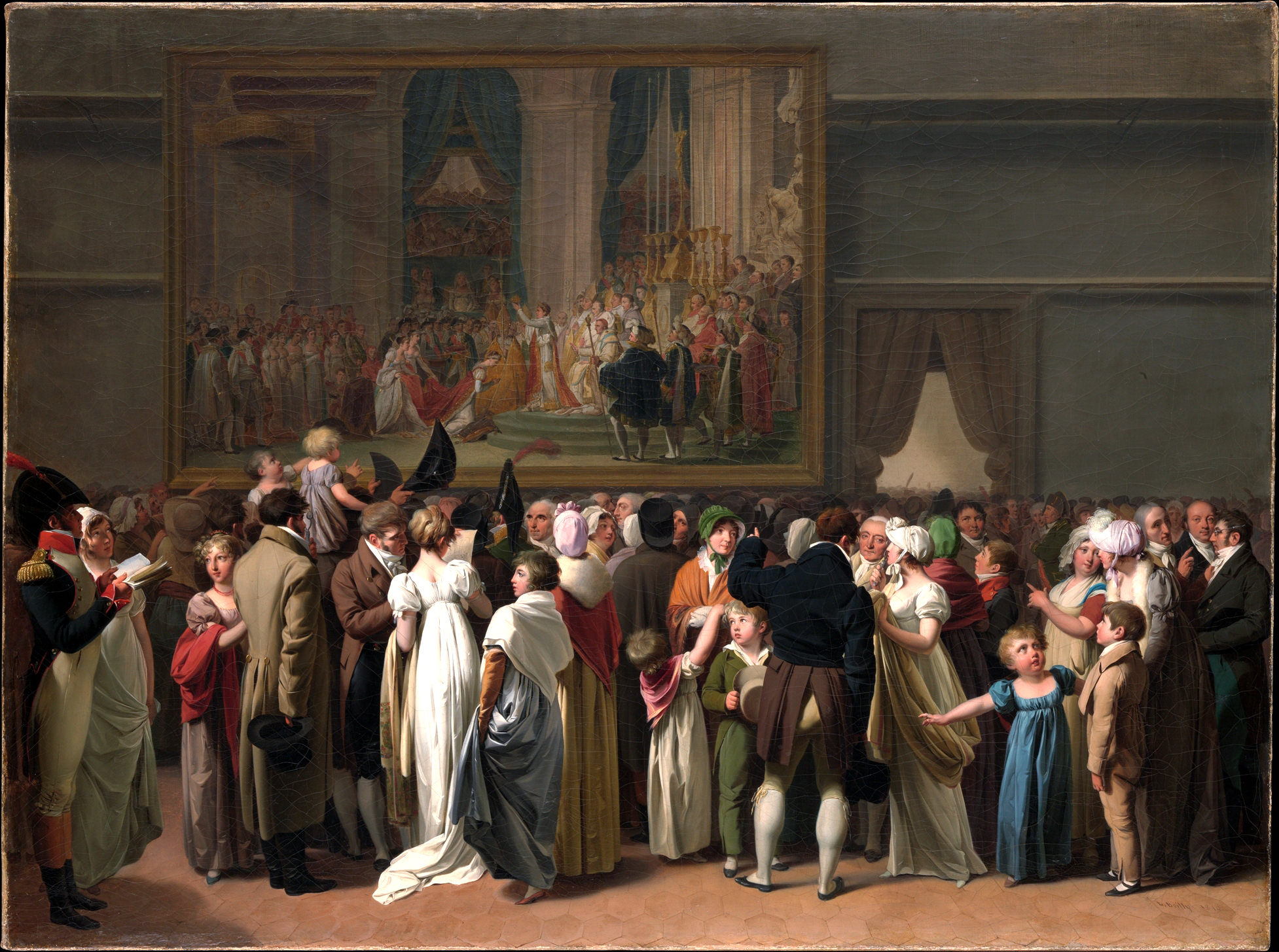
The Public Viewing David's 'Coronation' at the Louvre by Louis-Léopold Boilly, 1810

According to the census taken by the government, the population of Paris in 1801 was 546,856 persons By 1811, it had grown to 622,636.

The wealthiest Parisians lived in the western neighborhoods of the city, along the Champs-Élysées, and the neighborhood around Place Vendome. The poorest Parisians were concentrated in the east, in two neighborhoods; around Mount Sainte-Genevieve in the modern 7th arrondissement, and in the faubourg Saint-Marcel and faubourg Saint-Antoine.

The population of the city varied by season; between March and November, 30-40,000 workers to Paris from the French regions; stonemasons and stone cutters who came from the Massif Central and Normandy to work on building construction, weavers and dyers from Belgium and Flanders, and unskilled workers from the Alpine regions, who worked as street sweepers and porters. They would return home during the winter months with what they had earned.

=== The old and new aristocracy ===
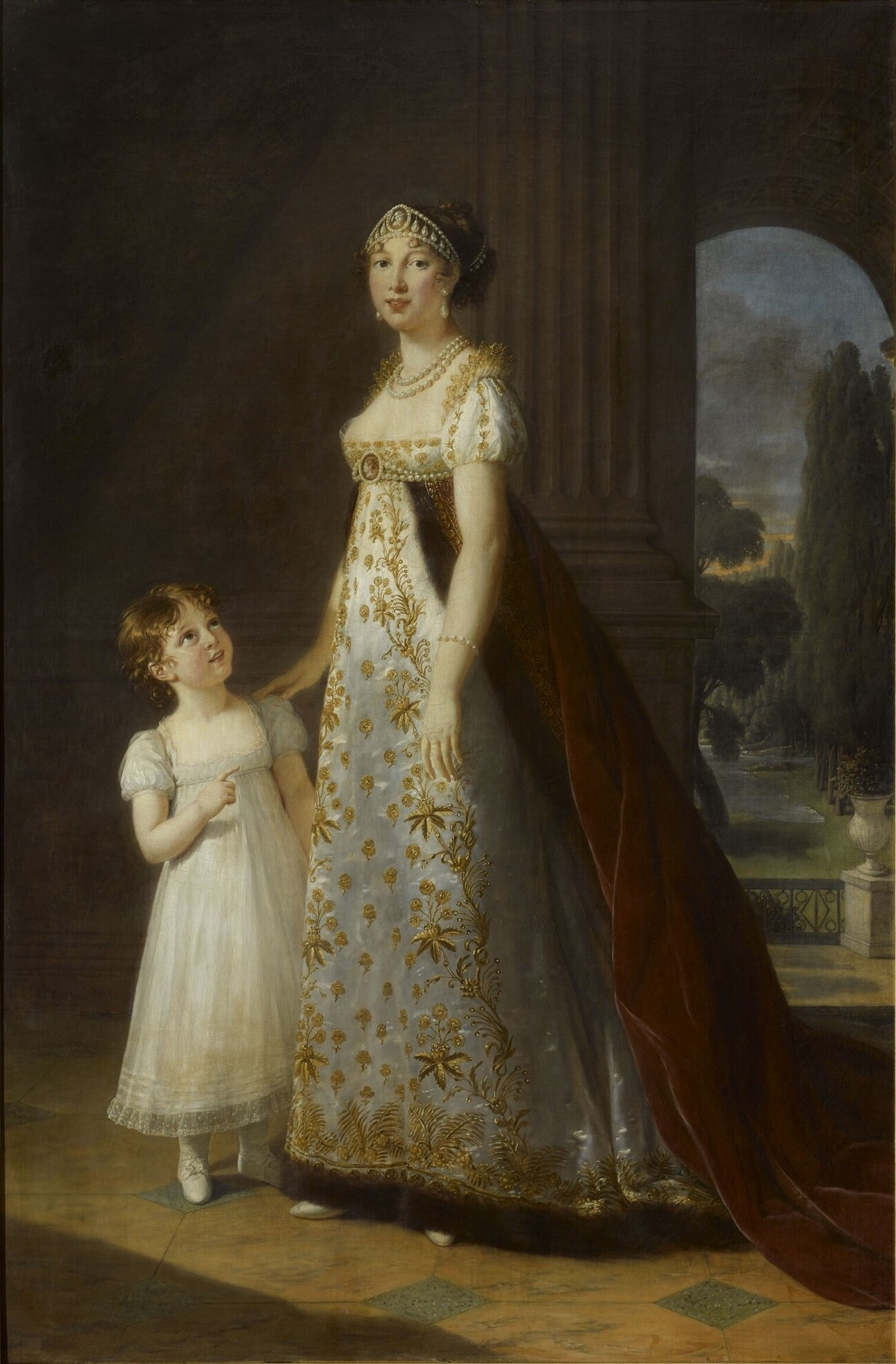
Caroline Murat, sister of Napoleon and wife of one of his Marechals, a member of the new aristocracy

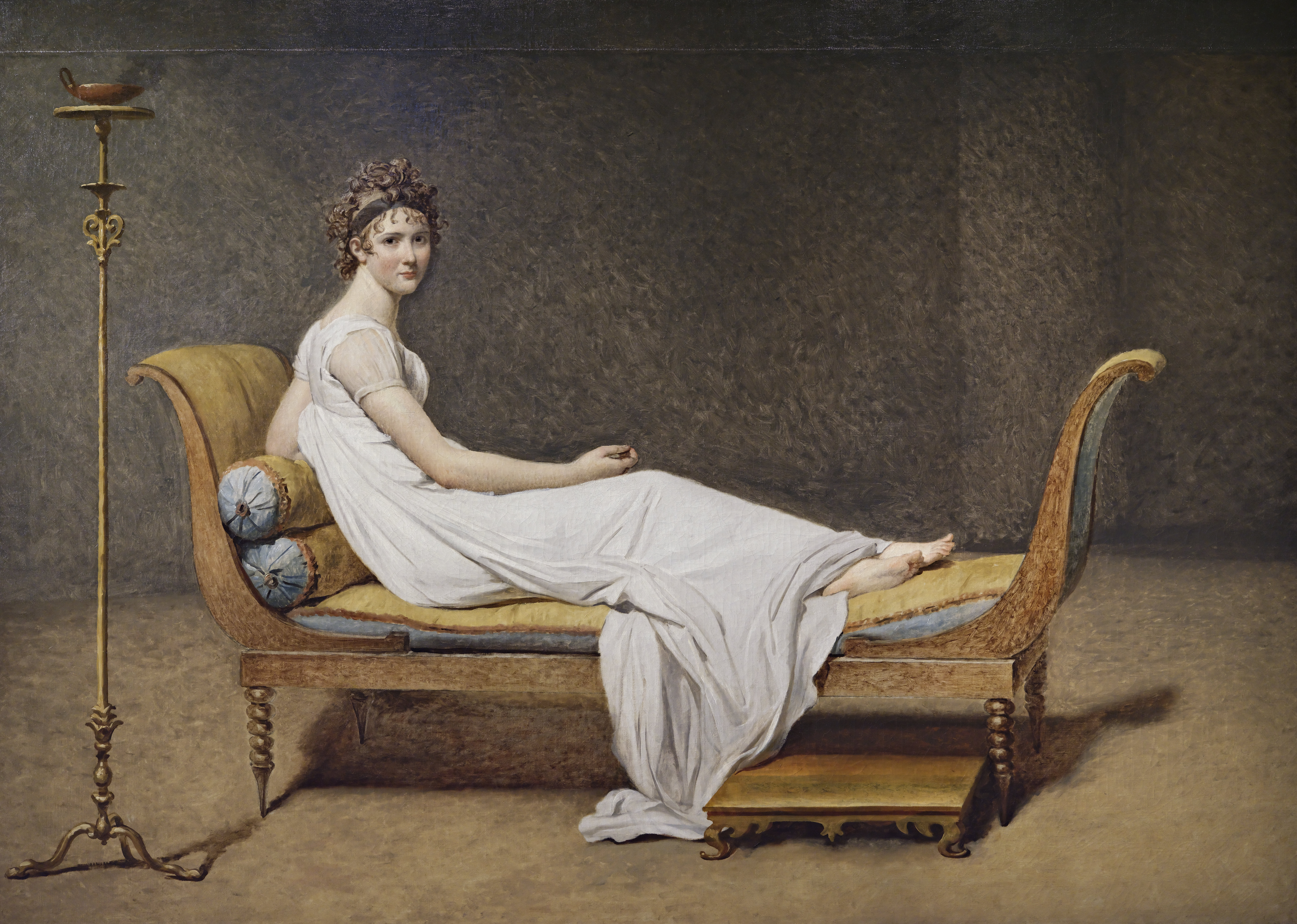
Portrait of Madame Récamier by Jacques-Louis David (1800, Louvre). She lived, along with the wealthiest Parisians of the First Empire, in the faubourgs of Saint-Honoré and Chaussėe d'Antin.

At the top of the social structure of Paris was the aristocracy, both old and new. In 1788, before the Revolution, the old nobility in Paris had numbered 15–17,000 persons, about three percent of the population. Those who escaped execution during the terror fled abroad to England, Germany, Spain, Russia, and even the United States. Most returned during the reign of Napoleon, and many found positions in the new Imperial court and government. They built new houses, mostly in the area around the Champs-Élysées. They were joined by a new aristocracy created by Napoleon, consisting of his generals, ministers and courtiers, as well as bankers, industrialists, and those who furnished military supplies; about three thousand persons altogether. The new aristocrats often made alliances by marriage with old families, who needed money. One old aristocrat, the Duke of Montmorency, told Marshal Jean-de-Dieu Soult, who had been made a duke by Napoleon, "You are a duke, but you have no ancestors!" Soult replied, "It's true. We are the ancestors."

The wealthiest and most distinguished Parisians during the first Empire purchased town houses between the Palais Royal and the Etoile, especially on the rue du Faubourg Saint Honoré and rue de la Chaussée-d'Antin: Joseph Bonaparte, the older brother of the Emperor, lived at 31 rue du Faubourg Saint-Honoré, his sister Pauline at number 39, Marshal Louis-Alexandre Berthier at number 35, Marshal Bon-Adrien Jeannot de Moncey in number 63, and Marshal Joachim Murat in number 55, which is now the Élysée Palace, the residence of the Presidents of France. Juliette Récamier lived at number 9 Chaussée d'Antin, General Jean Victor Marie Moreau at number 20, and Cardinal Fesch, uncle of Napoleon, at number 68. Other notables of the First Empire settled on the left bank, in the faubourg Saint-Germain. Eugène de Beauharnais, son of the Empress Josephine, lived at 78 rue de Lille, Lucien Bonaparte, younger brother of the Emperor, at 14 rue Saint-Dominique, and Marshal Louis-Nicolas Davout at 57 and later 59 on the same street.

=== The wealthy and the middle class ===
Below the old and new aristocracy, there was a large middle class of about 150,000 persons, accounting for about a quarter of the city's population. The lower middle class included small shopkeepers, artisans who had a few employees, government employees, and those in the liberal professions; doctors, lawyers, and accountants. The new upper middle class included Napoleon's generals and high officials, the most successful doctors and lawyers, and a new class of wealthy Parisians who made their money selling supplies to the army, by buying then reselling nationalized property, such as churches; and by speculating in the stock market. It also included a handful of individuals who had begun the first industrial enterprises in Paris: chemical factories, textile mills, and factories making machinery. The newly wealthy, like the aristocracy, tended to live in the west of the city, between Place Vendôme and Etoile, or on the left bank in the Faubourg Saint-Germain.

=== The artisans and workers ===
About 90,000 Parisians, men, women and often children, earned their living as manual workers. According to an 1807 survey by the prefect of police, the largest number worked in the food trades; there were 2250 bakers, 608 pastry chefs, 1269 butchers, 1566 restaurateurs, 16,111 lemonadiers, and 11,832 grocers, and many more in more specialized trades. Twenty-four thousand worked in the building trades, as masons, carpenters, plumbers and other trades. Thirty thousand worked in the clothing trades, including tailors, shoemakers, barbers, and hat-makers; another twelve thousand women worked as seamstresses and cleaning clothing. Twelve thousand worked in furniture workshops; eleven thousand in the metal industry. Fifty percent of the workers were younger than eighteen or older than forty; during the Empire, a large proportion of workers were conscripted into the army.

The artisans and workers were concentrated in the eastern neighborhoods. The faubourg Saint-Antoine included the new glass factory of Reuilly and factories making porcelain, pottery, wallpaper, breweries, and many smaller workshops making furniture, locks, and metalwork. The other major industrial neighborhood was the faubourg Saint-Marcel on the left bank, along the banks of the Bievre River, where the tanneries and dyeing workshops were located. Many artisans in these neighborhoods had just two rooms; the front room, with a window, served as the workshop, while the entire family lived in the darker back room. The working-class neighborhoods were densely populated; while the Champs-Élysées neighborhoods had 27,5 persons per hectare, in 1801 there were 1500 persons living in a hectare in the Arcis quarter, which included the Place de Grève, Châtelet and Saint-Jacques de la Boucherie, and a density of 1000 to 1500 persons around Les Halles, rue Saint-Denis and rue Saint-Martin. About sixty to seventy percent of the inhabitants of faubourgs Saint-Antoine and Saint-Marcel were born outside of Paris, mostly in the French provinces. Most came from the north, Picardy, Champagne, the Loire Valley, Berri, and Normandy.

=== Servants ===
Domestic servants, two-thirds of whom were women, made up about fifteen to twenty percent of the population of the capital. Before the Revolution they had worked largely for the nobility, whose families sometimes had as many as thirty servants. During the Empire they were employed more commonly by the new nobility, the newly wealthy and middle class. Upper-middle-class families often had three servants; families of artisans and shopkeepers usually had one. Living conditions of servants depended largely upon the personality of the master, but were never easy. Napoleon abolished the death penalty which previously could be given to a servant who stole from his master, but any servant who was even suspected of stealing would never be able to get another job. Any servant who became pregnant, married or not, could be dismissed immediately.

=== Prostitutes ===
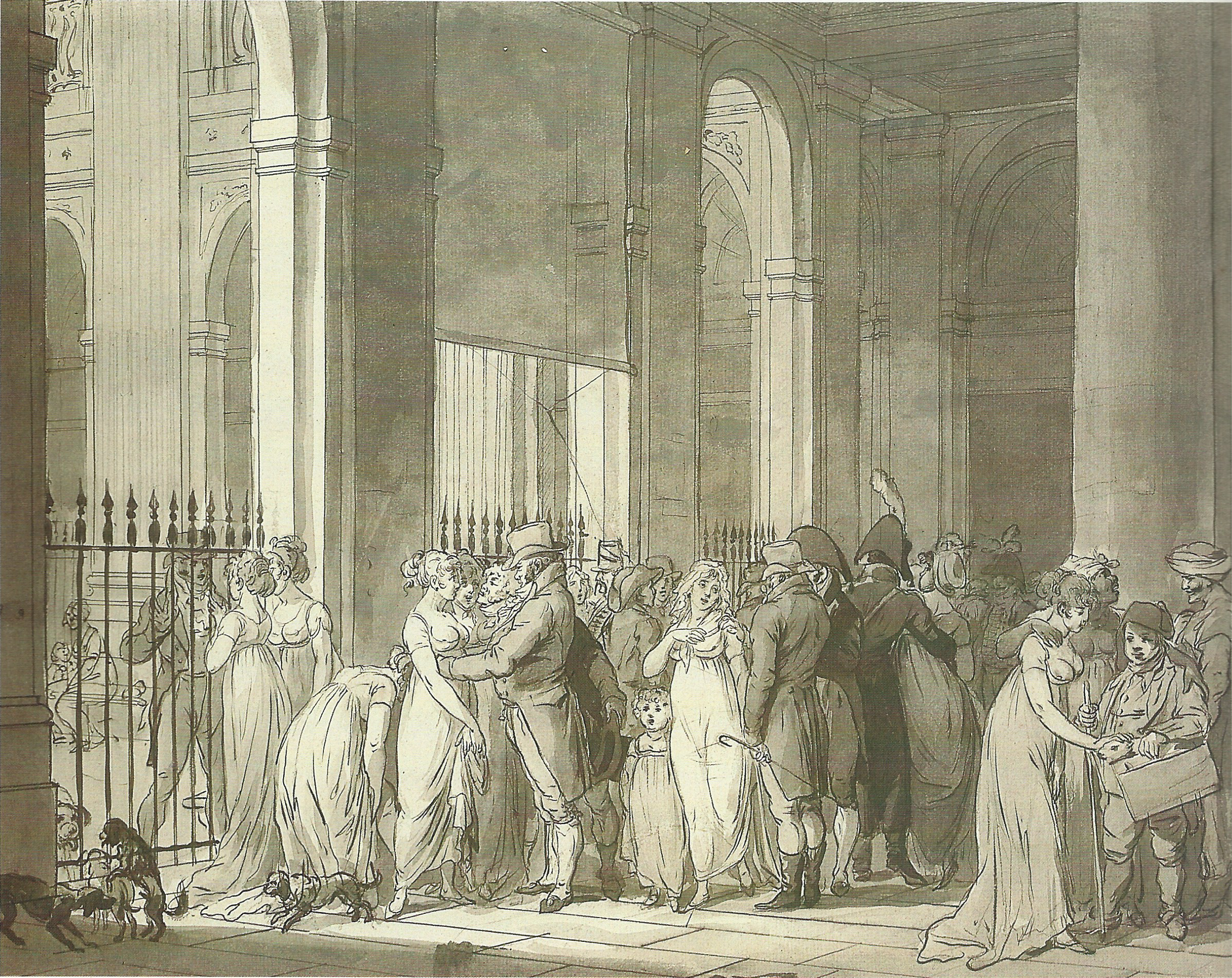
Prostitution in the Palais Royal, by Boilly

Prostitution was not legal, but was very common during the Empire. The prostitutes were often women who came from the provinces seeking work, or women who had part-time jobs but could not survive on their small salaries. In 1810, when Paris had a population of about 600,000 persons, the Minister of Police, Savary, estimated that there were 8000 to 9000 women working in maisons closes, or houses of prostitution; 3000 to 4000 who worked out of a rented room; 4000 who worked out of doors, in parks, courtyards, or even cemeteries; and 7000 to 8000 who were prostitutes when money ran short, who were otherwise employed in sewing, selling bouquets of flowers, or other low-paid professions. This accounted in total for five to eight percent of the female population of the city. According to one account from 1814, they had their own social hierarchy; the courtesans at the top, whose clients were exclusively the noble or wealthy; then a class composed of actresses, dancers, and those from the theater world; then semi-respectable prostitutes from the middle class who sometimes received clients at home, often with the husband's consent; then unemployed or working-women who needed money, down to the lowest level, who were found in the city's worst neighborhoods, the Port du Blé, the rue Purgée, and rue Planche Mibray.

=== The poor ===
According to Chabrol de Volvic, the Prefect of the Seine from 1812 to 1830, the number of beggars in Paris ranged from more than 110,000 in 1802 to about 100,000 persons in 1812. During the harsh winter of 1803, the Charity Bureaus of the city gave assistance to more than 100,000 persons. The poorest Parisians lived on the Montagne Saint-Genevieve, and the faubourgs Saint-Antoine and Saint-Marcel, and in the narrow streets of the Île de la Cité, which were particularly crowded. Claude Lachaise, in his Topographie médicale de Paris (1822), described a "bizarre assembly of buildings badly constructed, collapsing, damp and dark, each one occupied by twenty-nine or thirty persons, the largest number of whom are masons, iron workers, water-carriers, and street merchants ...the problems are increased by the small size of the rooms, the narrowness of the doors and windows, the multiplicity of families or households, which can reach ten in a single house, and by the influx of poor who are attracted by the low prices of the housing."

=== Children ===
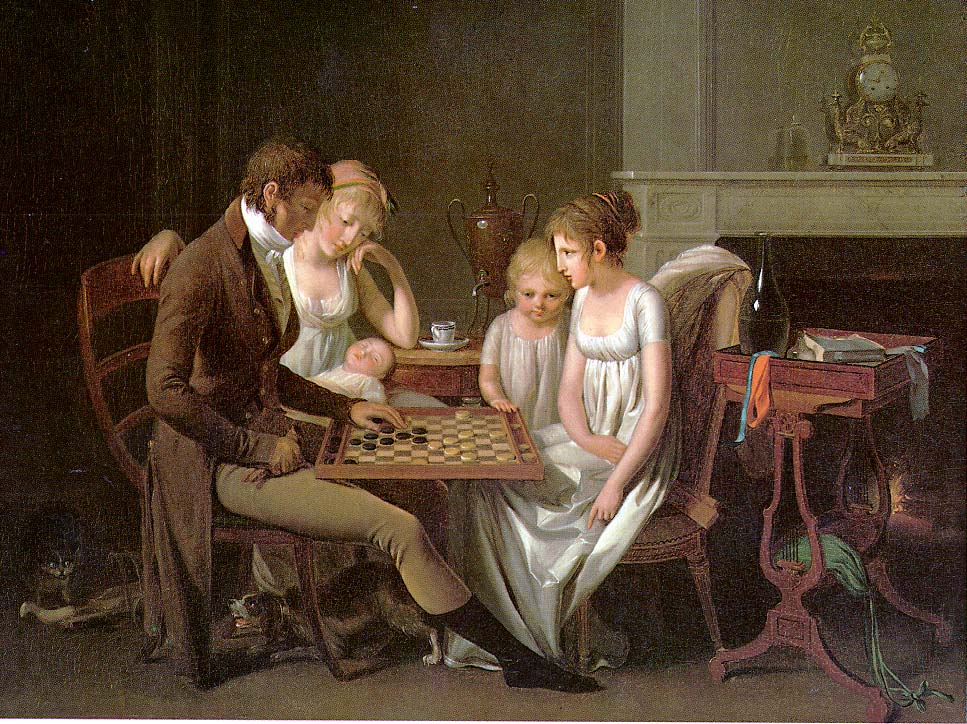
A Parisian family playing checkers (1803)

Children and young people were far more numerous in Paris during the Empire than in modern times. In 1800, forty percent of Parisians were under the age of eighteen, compared with 18.7 percent in 1994. Between 1801 and 1820, marriages produced an average of 4.3 children, compared with just .64 children in 1990. In the age before contraception, large numbers of unwanted children were also born, mostly to poor or working women. Five thousand eighty-five children were given to the Hospice des infants trouvées in 1806, about a quarter of the total number of children born in the city. Many newborns were simply clandestinely thrown into the Seine. The mortality rate at the city orphanages was very high; one third died in the first year, another third in the second year. While the children of the middle and upper classes went to school, the children of workers and the poor went to work, often at the age of ten, in a family business or workshop.

=== Marriage, divorce and homosexuality ===
Parisians under Napoleon married relatively old; the average age of marriage between 1789 and 1803 was between thirty and thirty-one for men and twenty-five to twenty-six for women. Unmarried couples living together in concubinage, especially in the working class, were also common. These couples were frequently stable and long-lasting; a third lived together for more than six years, twenty-two percent for more than nine years. Divorce had been common during the Revolution and the Consulate, when one in five marriages ended in divorce. Napoleon was in general hostile to divorces, though he himself divorced Empress Josephine. In 1804 the divorce rate had fallen to ten percent. The number of marriages increased greatly in the last years of the Empire, after the disastrous campaign in Russia, as many young men married to try to avoid military service. The number of marriages rose from 4,561 in 1812 to 6,585 in 1813, the largest number since 1796.

Homosexuality was condemned by the Catholic church but, if discreet, was tolerated in Paris. Napoleon did not approve of homosexuality, but during the Consulate, when absent from Paris on military campaigns, he gave interim power to the openly homosexual Jean-Jacques-Régis de Cambacérès. The police paid little attention to it, as long as it was not flagrant. Gay prostitutes were commonly found on the Quai Saint-Nicolas, the place Marché Neuf and the Champs-Élysées. The Prefect of Police reported in 1807 that gay persons were common among restaurateurs, limonadiers, tailors and wig-makers, "in ways that were honest and gentle, though they were rarely faithful." Tolerance of homosexuality lasted until 1817, during the restoration of the monarchy, when a campaign of repression began.

== Money, salaries and the cost of living ==
The metric system was introduced in 1803, as was the franc, worth one hundred centimes, and the sou, worth five centimes. The gold Napoleon coin was worth either 20 or 40 francs, and the government also issued silver coins worth five, two and one franc. The government did not have the resources to collect and remake all the coins of the former regimes, so the gold Louis, with an image of the King, worth 24 pounds, and the écu, a silver count worth three of six pounds, were also legal currency. The coins of all the states within the Empire were also in circulation, including those of the German states, northern and central Italy, the Netherlands, and the Austrian Netherlands (now Belgium).

In 1807, a skilled worker, such as a jeweler, perfumer, tailor or furniture maker, could earn 4-6 francs a day; a baker earned 8-12 francs a week; a stonemason earned 2-4 francs a day; an unskilled worker, such as construction laborer, earned 1.50 to 2.5 francs a day. Much of the work was seasonal; most construction work stopped during the winter. Women's salaries were lower; a worker in a tobacco factory earned one franc a day, while women making embroidery or seamstresses earned 50-60 centimes a day, government salaries in 1800 were fixed on a scale of 8000 francs a year for a chief of a division of a Ministry down to 2500 francs a year for a messenger.

Fixed prices on goods were rare during the first Empire; almost every product or service was subject to bargaining. However, bread prices were set by the government, and the price of a loaf of four pounds ranged between fifty and ninety centimes during the Empire. A kilogram of beef, depending on quality, cost between 95 and 115 centimes; a liter of ordinary wine from Macon, between 68-71 centimes. A pair of silk stockings for a woman cost 10 francs, a pair of a man's leather shoes cost 11 to 14 francs. The Emperor's famous hats, purchased at the hat maker Poupard, cost sixty francs each. A bath in a bath-house cost 1.25 francs, a haircut for a woman 1.10 francs, a consultation with a doctor cost 3-4 francs. The price of room for two persons on the third floor in the low-income Saint-Jacques neighborhood was 36 francs a year. The average rent of modest-income Parisians was about 69 francs a year; the wealthiest one-eighth of Parisians paid rents of more than 150 francs a year; in 1805 the sculptor Moitte, with a household of seven persons, paid annual rent of 1500 francs for an apartment with a grand salon and bedroom overlooking the Seine, two other bedrooms, dining room, bathroom, kitchen, and cave, in the Faubourg Saint-Germain.

== The administration of the city ==
During the French Revolution Paris briefly had a democratically elected mayor and government, the first Paris Commune. This system never really functioned and was suppressed by the French Directory, which eliminated the position of Mayor and divided Paris into twelve separate municipalities, whose leaders were selected by the national government. A new law on 17 February 1800 modified the system; Paris became a single commune, divided into twelve arrondissements, each with its own mayor, once again chosen by Napoleon and the national government. A Council of the Department of the Seine was also created to act as a sort of city council, but its members were also chosen by the national leaders. The real rulers of the city were the Prefect of the Seine, who had his office at the Hôtel de Ville, and the Prefect of Police, whose headquarters was on rue Jerusalem and the quai des Orfèvres on the Île de la Cité. This system, with a brief interruption during the Paris Commune in 1871, remained in effect until 1977.

Paris was divided into twelve arrondissements and forty-eight neighborhoods, which corresponded to the Sections created during the French Revolution. The Arrondissements were similar but not identical to the first twelve arrondissements today; they were numbered differently, with the arrondissements on the right bank numbered from one to six from left to right, and the arrondissements on the left bank numbered left to right from seven to twelve. Thus the first arrondissement under Napoleon is largely the 8th arrondissement today, the 6th Napoleonic arrondissement is the modern 1st arrondissement, the Napoleonic 7th is the modern 3rd; and the Napoleonic 12th is the modern 5th. The borders of Paris in 1800 are roughly those of the 12 modern arrondissements; the city limits follow the route of the modern metro line 2 (Nation-Port Dauphine), stopping at Charles-de-Gaulle-Etoile, and those of line 6, from Etoile to Nation.

=== The police and crime ===
Public order in Paris was a top priority of Napoleon. His prefect of police directed forty-eight commissaires of police, one for each neighborhood, and an additional two hundred police inspectors in civilian clothes. None of the police, in fact, had uniforms; a uniformed police force was not established until March 1829. The police were supported by a municipal guard, the Garde municipale de Paris, with 2,154 guardsmen on foot and 180 on horseback.

One of the major concerns of the police was the smuggling of goods, especially wine, into the city past the Wall of the Ferme générale, built around the city between 1784 and 1791, where merchants were supposed to pay customs duties. Many smugglers used tunnels under the wall; seventeen tunnels were discovered in 1801 and 1802; one tunnel between Chaillot and Passy was three hundred meters long. Sixty barrels of wine were seized in one tunnel during the same period. Many taverns and guingettes, appeared just outside the walls, particularly in the village of Montmartre, where the untaxed drinks were much cheaper than in the city. The city administration was eventually able to defeat the smugglers by giving higher salaries to the customs agents at the gates, rotating them regularly, and tearing down buildings close to the walls, from which the smugglers operated.

Theft was another common concern of the police, increasing or decreasing depending upon economic conditions; there were 1400 recorded thefts in 1809, but 2,727 in 1811. Murders were rare; thirteen in 1801, 17 in 1808, and 28 in 1811. The most sensational crime of the period was committed by the grocer Trumeau, who poisoned his eldest daughter so he would not have to pay her dowry. Despite some notorious crimes, foreign travelers reported that Paris was one of the safest large cities in Europe; after a visit in 1806-07, the German Karl Berkheim wrote "According to those who know Paris, even long before the Revolution, this city has never been as tranquil as it is at this moment. One can walk in complete security, at any hour of the night, in the streets of Paris."

=== The firemen ===
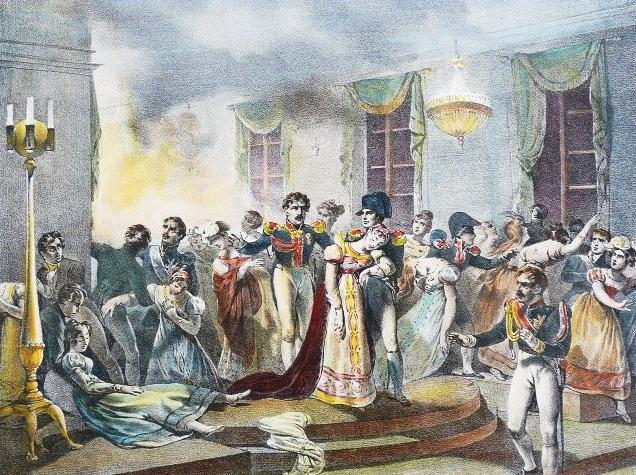
Napoleon and the Empress Marie-Louise escape a deadly fire at the Austrian Embassy (1810). Afterwards, Paris firemen were organized like military units.

At the beginning of the Empire, the 293 firemen of Paris were underpaid, untrained and poorly equipped. They usually lived at home and had second jobs, usually as shoemakers. They reported to both the Prefect of the Seine and the Prefect of Police, which caused bureaucratic disputes. They possessed only two ladders, one kept at the National Library, and other at the market of Les Halles. Their shortcomings became evident on 1 July 1810, when a fire broke out at the Austrian Embassy on the Chausée d'Antin during a ball given to celebrate the wedding of Napoleon and Marie-Louise of Austria. Napoleon and Marie-Louise escaped unharmed, but the wife of the Austrian Ambassador and the Princess de la Leyen were killed, and a dozen other guests died later from their burns. Napoleon himself wrote a report of the event, noting that only six firemen had appeared, and several of them were drunk. Napoleon issued a decree on September 18, 1811 which militarized the firemen into a battalion of sapeur-pompiers, with four companies of one hundred forty-two men each, under the Prefect of Police and the Ministry of the Interior. The firemen were required to live in four barracks built for them around the city, and to have watchmen on duty around the city.

=== Health and sickness ===
The health care system of Paris had been severely strained during the Revolution and the Consulate, with little funding or attention given to hospitals. The Revolutionary government, in the name of equality, had abolished the requirement that doctors have licenses, and had allowed anyone to treat patients; in 1801 Napoleon's new Prefect of the Seine reported that, of the seven hundred persons listed as "doctors" in the official Almanac of Commerce, only three hundred had formal medical training. A new law on 9 March 1803 restored the title of "Doctor" and the requirement that physicians have medical degrees. Nonetheless, treatment was primitive by modern standards; anesthesia, antiseptics and modern hygienic practices did not yet exist; surgeons operated with their bare hands, wearing their normal street dress with the sleeves rolled up.

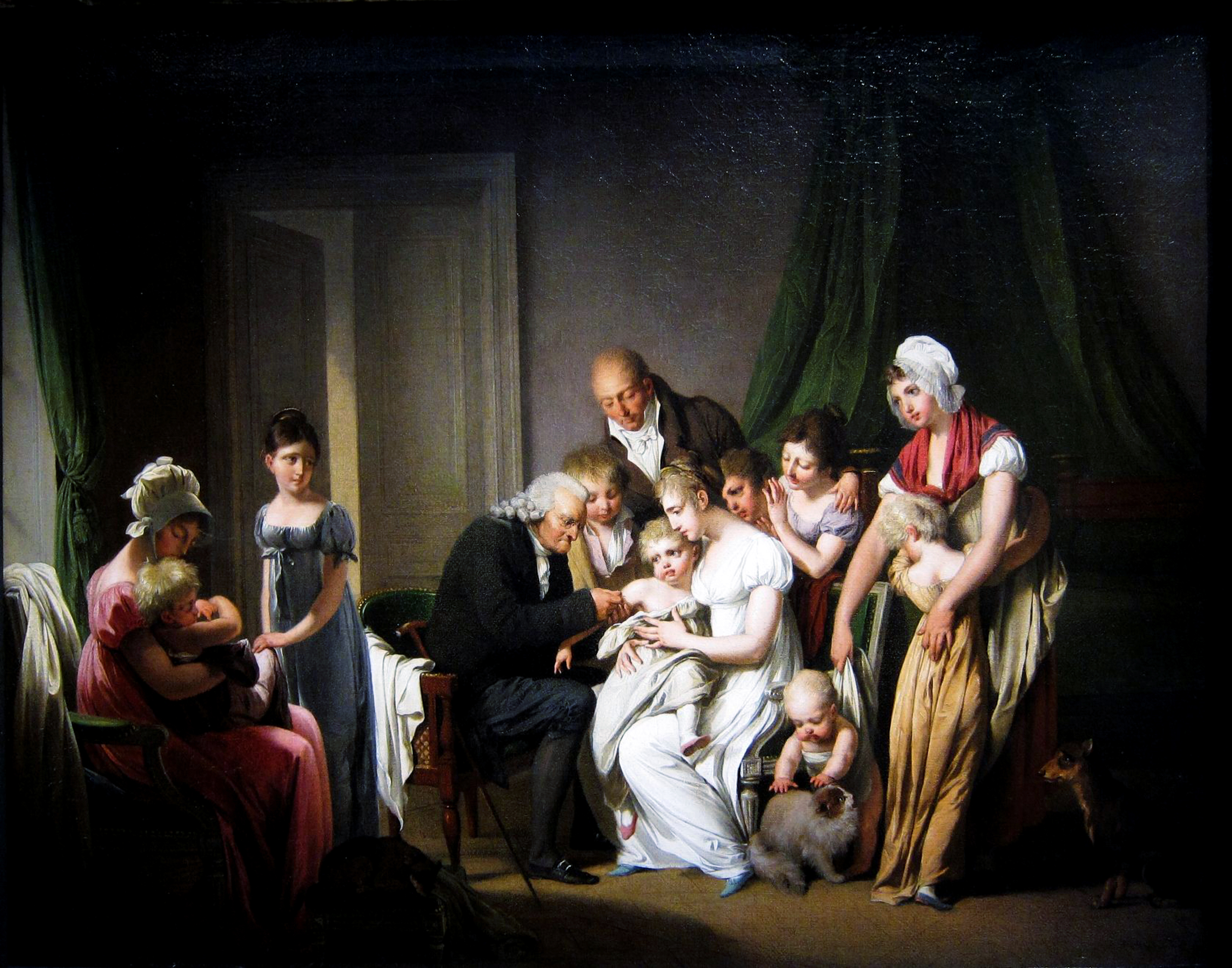
Doctor giving an inoculation against smallpox, by Louis Léopold Boilly (1807)

Napoleon re-organized the hospital system, putting the eleven city hospitals, with five thousand beds altogether, under the administration of the Prefect of the Seine. This was the beginning of the system of municipal public medical assistance for the poor. The other major hospital, Val-de-Grace, was under military administration. The new system recruited the most famous doctors of the time, including Jean-Nicolas Corvisart, Napoleon's personal doctor, and Philippe-Jean Pelletan. The hospitals treated 26,000 patients in 1805 and 43,000 in 1812; the mortality rate of patients ranged between ten and fifteen percent: 4216 died in 1805, and 5634 in 1812.

The serious epidemic of influenza struck the city in the winter of 1802–1803; its most prominent sufferers were the Empress Josephine and her daughter, Hortense de Beauharnais, the mother of Napoleon III, who both survived; it killed the poet Jean François de Saint-Lambert, and writers Laharpe and Maréchal. Napoleon created a Health Council under the Prefect of Police to monitor the safety of the water supply, food products, and the environmental effects of new factories and workshops. The committee also made the first systematic surveys of health conditions in Paris neighborhoods, and provided the first widespread vaccinations against smallpox. Napoleon also made efforts to improve the health of the city, by building a canal to provide fresh water and by constructing sewers under the streets that he built, but their effects were limited. An abundant water supply, health standards for housing and efficient sewers did not arrive until Napoleon III and the Second Empire.

=== Cemeteries ===
Prior to Napoleon each parish church in the city had its own small cemetery. For reasons of public health, Louis XIV had decided to close the cemeteries inside the city and move the remains outside the city limits, but only one, the largest, that of the Innocents near Les Halles, had actually been closed. The remaining cemeteries had been neglected since the Revolution and the closure of the churches, and were frequent targets for grave-robbers, who sold the cadavers to medical schools. Frochet, the prefect of Paris, ordered the construction of three large new cemeteries to the north, east and south of the city. The first of these, to the east, had his first burial on 21 May 1804. It became known as Pere Lachaise, for the confessor of Louis XIV, whose country house had been on the site. To the north, the existing cemetery of Montmartre was enlarged, and a new cemetery was planned to the south at Montparnasse, but did not open until 1824. The bones from the old cemeteries within the city limits were exhumed and moved to the abandoned underground stone quarries of the hill of Montsouris. In 1810-11 the new site was given the name the Catacombs and opened to the public.

== Architecture and the cityscape ==
=== The streets ===
In the western neighborhoods of the city, near the Champs Élysées, the streets, mostly built in the 17th and 18th centuries, were reasonably wide and straight. A very few, including the Chausée d'Antin and the rue de l'Odéon, had sidewalks, which had first been introduced into Paris in 1781. The Paris streets in the center and east of the city, with few exceptions, were narrow, twisting, and confined by high rows of houses, sometimes six or seven stories high, which blocked the light. They had no sidewalks, and had a narrow channel down the center with served as a sewer and storm drain. Pedestrians were compelled to compete with traffic in the center of the street. The streets often covered with a thick mud, which clung to shoes and clothing. The mud was mixed with the excrement of the horses who pulled wagons and carriages. A particular Paris profession, the decrotteur, had appeared; men who were expert at scraping mud from shoes. When it rained entrepreneurs put planks over the mud, and charged pedestrians to pass over them. Napoleon made an effort to improve the traffic circulation in the heart of the city by creating new streets; in 1802, on the land of the former convents of the Assumption and the Capucins, he built rue du Mont-Thabor. In 1804 he demolished the Convent of the Feuillants, next to the Louvre, where Louis XVI had briefly been held before being imprisoned in the old Temple, and began construction of a wide new street, the Rue de Rivoli, which was extended from the Place de la Concorde as far as Place des Pyramides. It was constructed between 1811 and 1835, and became the most important east-west axis along the right bank. It was finally finished as far as rue Saint-Antoine by his nephew Napoleon III in 1855. In 1806, on the land of the convent of the Capucins, he built another wide street with sidewalks, named rue Napoleon, between Place Vendôme and the grand boulevards. After his downfall it was renamed Rue de la Paix. In 1811 Napoleon opened the rue de Castiglione, also on site of the old convent of the Feulliants, to connect rue de Rivoli with Place Vendome.

=== The bridges ===
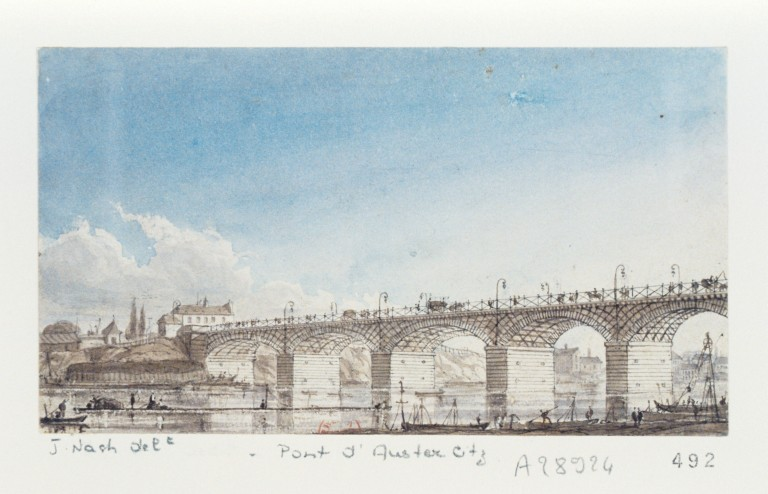
The first Pont d'Austerlitz (1801–1807) lined the faubourg Saint-Antoine with the Jardin des Plantes and industries of the left bank

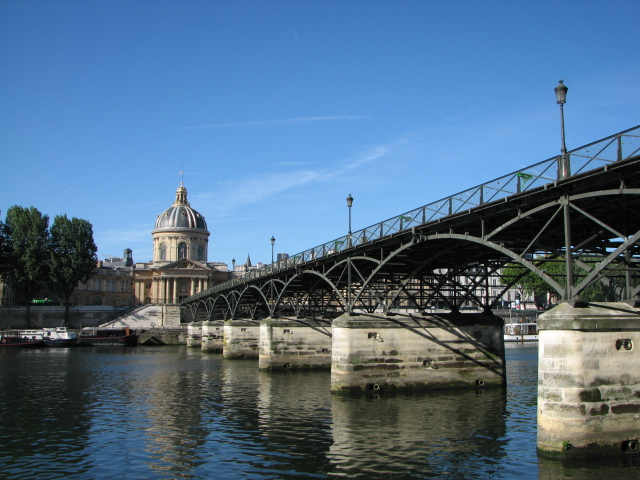
The Pont des Arts, the first iron bridge in the city (1802–1804)

To improve the movement of traffic, goods and people in the city, Napoleon built three new bridges, in addition to the six that already existed, and named two of them after his famous victories. He built the Pont des Arts (1802–1804) the first iron bridge in the city, connecting the left bank with the Louvre, a wing of which he had converted into an art gallery, called the Palais des Arts or the Musée Napoleon, which gave the bridge its name. The deck of the bridge was lined with citrus trees in pots, and cost one sou to cross. Further east he built the Pont d'Austerlitz (1801–1807) connecting the Jardin des Plantes and workshops of the left bank with the working-class neighborhoods of Faubourg Saint-Antoine. It was replaced by his nephew, Napoleon III, in 1854. To the west he constructed the Pont d'Iéna, (1808–1814) which linked the large parade ground of the École Militaire on the left bank with the hill of Chaillot, where he intended to build a palace for his son, the King of Rome. The new bridge was just finished at the fall of the Empire; the new regime replaced the eagles of Napoleon with the initial of King Louis XVIII.

=== Street numbers ===
Napoleon made one other important contribution to the Paris streets. The numbering of houses had begun in 1729, but each section of the city had its own system, and sometimes the same number would occur several times on the same street, numbers were out of sequence, number 3 might be found near number to 10, and there was no uniformity in where the numbers began. On February 5, 1805, a decree of Duflot, the Prefect of Police, imposed a common system of street numbering to the whole city; numbers were paired, with the even numbers on the right and the odd numbers on the left, and the numbers beginning at the closest point to Seine and increasing as they went away from the river. The new numbers were put up in the summer of 1805, and the system remains in place today.

=== The passages ===
The narrowness, crowds and mud on the Paris streets led to the creation of a new kind of commercial street, the covered passage, dry and well-lit, where Parisians be sheltered from the weather, stroll, look in the shop windows, and dine in cafes. The first such gallery was opened at the Palais-Royal in 1786, and became immediately popular. It was followed by the Passage Feydau (1790–91), Passage du Caire (1799), Passage des Panoramas (1800), Galerie Saint-Honoré (1807), Passage Delorme (between 188 rue de Rivoli and 177 rue Saint-Honoré, in 1808, and the galerie and passage Montesquieu (now rue Montesquieu) in 1811 and 1812. The Passage des Panoramas took its name from an exhibition organized on the site by the American inventor Robert Fulton. He came to Paris in 1796 to try to interest Napoleon and the French Directory in his inventions, the steamship, submarine and torpedo; while waiting for an answer he built an exhibit space with two rotundas and showed panoramic paintings of Paris, Toulon, Jerusalem, Rome and other cities. Napoleon, who had little interest in the navy, rejected Fulton's inventions, and Fulton went to London instead. In 1800 the covered shopping street opened in the same building, and became a popular success.

=== Monuments ===
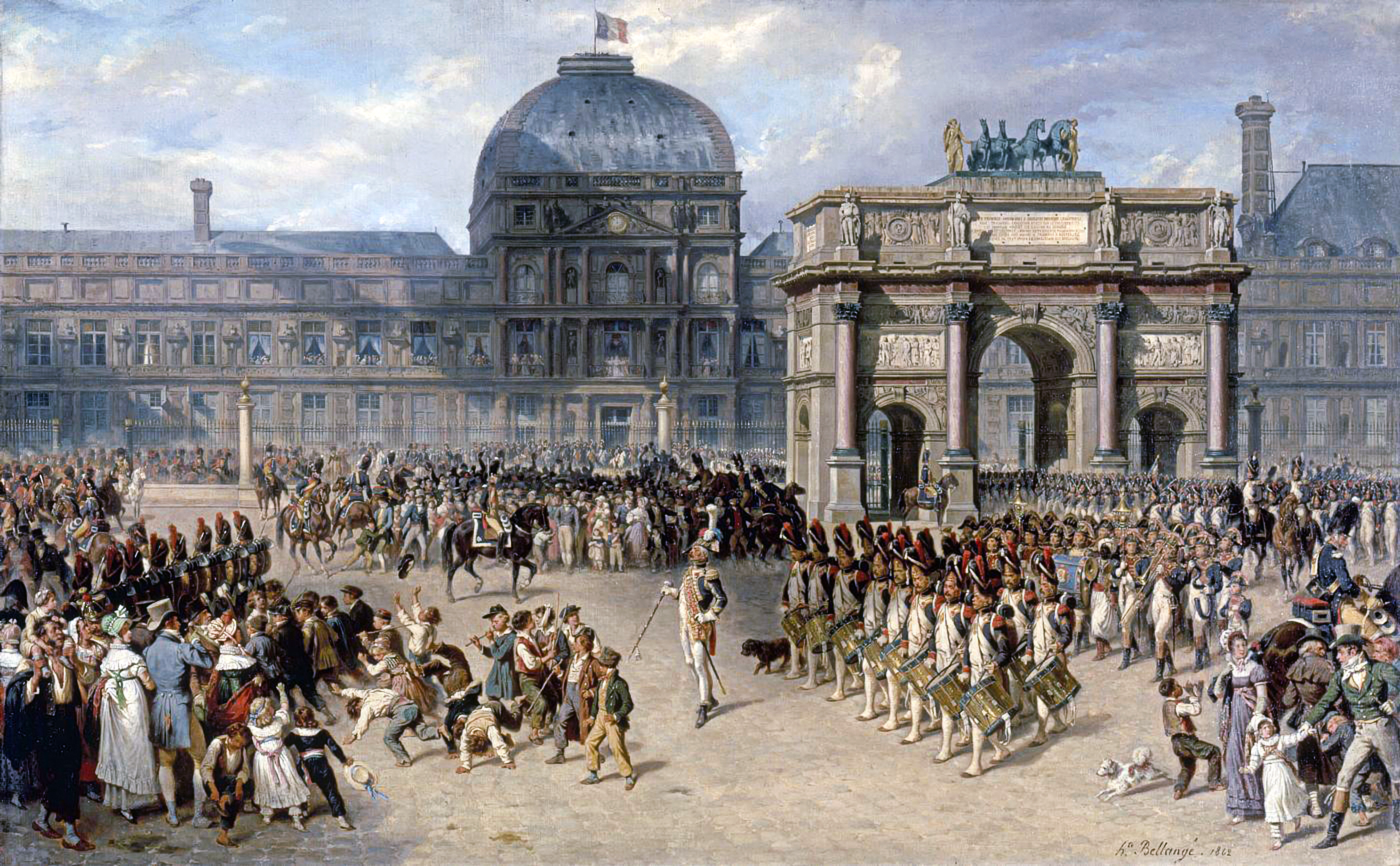
Military review in front of the Tuileries in 1810, by Hippolyte Bellangé. Military parades took place around the new Arc de Triomphe du Carrousel (1806–08).

In 1806, in imitation of Ancient Rome, Napoléon ordered the construction of a series of monuments dedicated to the military glory of France. The first and largest was the Arc de Triomphe, built at the edge of the city at the Barrière d'Étoile, and not finished before July 1836. He ordered the building of the smaller Arc de Triomphe du Carrousel (1806–1808), copied from the arch of Arch of Septimius Severus and Constantine in Rome, next to the Tuileries Palace. It was crowned with a team of bronze horses he took from the façade of St Mark's Basilica in Venice. His soldiers celebrated his victories with grand parades around the Carrousel. He also commissioned the building of the Vendôme Column (1806–1810), copied from the Trajan's Column in Rome, made of the iron of cannon captured from the Russians and Austrians in 1805. At the end of the Rue de la Concorde (given again its former name of Rue Royale on 27 April 1814), he took the foundations of an unfinished church, the Église de la Madeleine, which had been started in 1763, and transformed it into the Temple de la Gloire, a military shrine to display the statues of France's most famous generals.

=== The churches ===
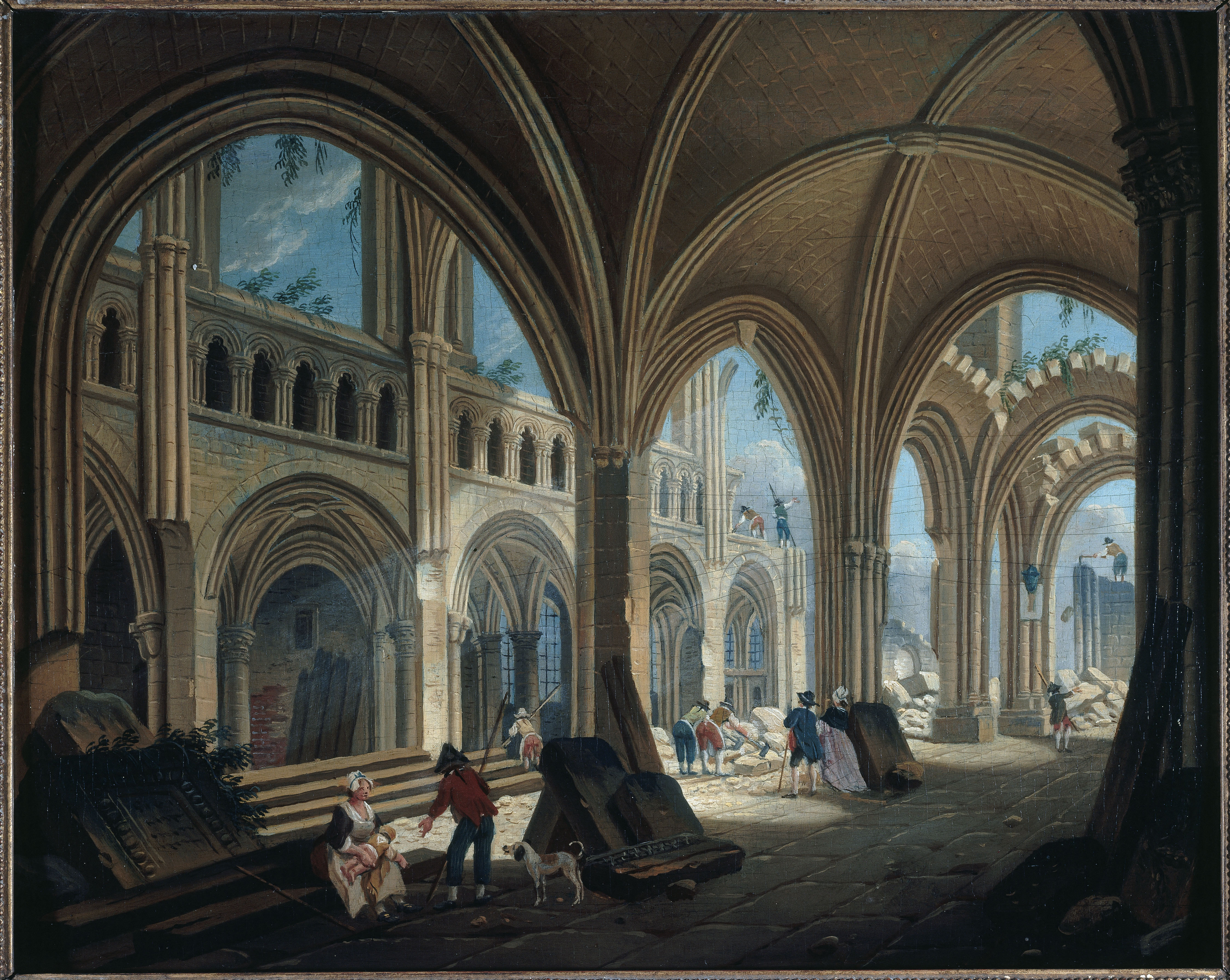
Demolition of the church of Saint-Jean-en-Greve, by Pierre-Antoine Demachy (about 1800)

Among the most dismal sights in Napoleonic Paris were the churches which had been closed and wrecked during and after the Revolution. All of the churches were confiscated and made into national property, and were put on sale beginning in 1791. Most of the churches were demolished not by the Revolutionaries, but by real estate speculators, who bought them, took out and sold the furnishings, and demolished the buildings for building materials and to create land for real estate speculation. Twenty-two churches and fifty-one convents were destroyed between 1790 and 1799, and another 12 churches and 22 convents between 1800 and 1814. Convents were particular targets, because they had large buildings and extensive gardens and lands which could be subdivided and sold. Poumies de La Siboutie, a French doctor from Périgord who visited Paris in 1810, wrote: "Everywhere there are the hideous imprints of the Revolution. These are the churches and convents half-ruined, dilapidated, abandoned. On their walls, as well as on a large number of public buildings, you can read: "National Property for Sale"."" The words could still be read on the facade of Notre Dame, which had been saved, in 1833. When Napoleon was crowned Emperor in Notre Dame Cathedral in 1804, the extensive damage to the building inside and outside was hidden by curtains.

On July 15, 1801, Napoleon signed a Concordat with the Pope, which allowed the thirty-five surviving parish churches and two hundred chapels and other religious institutions of Paris to reopen. The 289 priests remaining in Paris were again allowed to wear their clerical costumes in the street, and the church bells of Paris (those which had not been melted down) rang again for the first time since the Revolution. However, the buildings and property which had been seized from the church was not returned, and the Parisian clergy were kept under the close supervision of the government; the bishop of Paris was nominated by the Emperor, and confirmed by the Pope.

=== Water ===
Prior to Napoleon, the drinking water of Paris came either from the Seine, from wells in the basements of buildings, or from fountains in public squares. Water bearers, mostly from the Auvergne, carrying two buckets on a pole over their shoulder, carried water from the fountains or, since there was a charge for water from fountains, or, if the fountains were too crowded, from the Seine, to homes, for a charge of a sou (five centimes) for a bucket of about fifteen liters. The fountains were supplied with water by two large pumps next to the river, the Samaritaine and Notre-Dame, dating from the 17th century. and by two large steam pumps installed in 1781 at Chaillot and Gros Caillou. In 1800 there were fifty-five fountains for drinking water in Paris, one per each ten thousand Parisians. The fountains only ran at certain hours, were turned off at night, and there was a small charge for each bucket taken.

Shortly after taking power, Napoleon told the celebrated chemist, Jean-Antoine Chaptal, who was then the Minister of the Interior: "I want to do something great and useful for Paris." Chaptal replied immediately, "Give it water". Napoleon seemed surprised, but the same evening ordered the first studies of a possible aqueduct from the Ourcq River to the basin of La Valette in Paris. The canal was begun in 1802, and completed in 1808. Beginning in 1812, the water was distributed free to Parisians from the city fountains. In May 1806 Napoleon issued a decree that water should run from the fountains both day and night. He also built new fountains around the city, both small and large, the most dramatic of which were the Egyptian Fountain on rue de Sèvres and the Fontaine du Palmier, both still in existence. He also began construction of the Canal St. Martin to further river transportation within the city.

Napoléon's last water project was, in 1810, the Elephant of the Bastille, a fountain in the shape of a colossal bronze elephant, twenty-four meters high, which was intended for the centre of the Place de la Bastille, but he did not have time to finish it: an enormous plaster mockup of the elephant stood in the square for many years after the emperor's final defeat and exile.

=== Street lighting ===
During the First Empire, Paris was far from being the City of Light. The main streets were dimly illuminated by 4,200 oil lanterns hung from posts, which could be lowered on a cord so they could be lit without a ladder. The number grew to 4,335 by 1807, but was still far from sufficient. One problem was the quantity and quality of the oil being supplied by private contractors; lamps did not burn all night, and often did not burn at all. Also, lamps were placed far apart, so much of the street remained in darkness. For this reason persons going home after the theater or who needed to travel through the city at night hired porte-falots, or torch-bearers, to illuminate their way. Napoleon was furious at the shortcoming: in May 1807, from his military headquarters in Poland, he wrote to Fouché, his Minister of Police, responsible for street lights: "I've learned that the streets of Paris are no longer being lit." (May 1); "The non-lighting of Paris is becoming a crime, it's necessary to put an end to this abuse, because the public is beginning to complain." (23 May).

=== Transportation ===
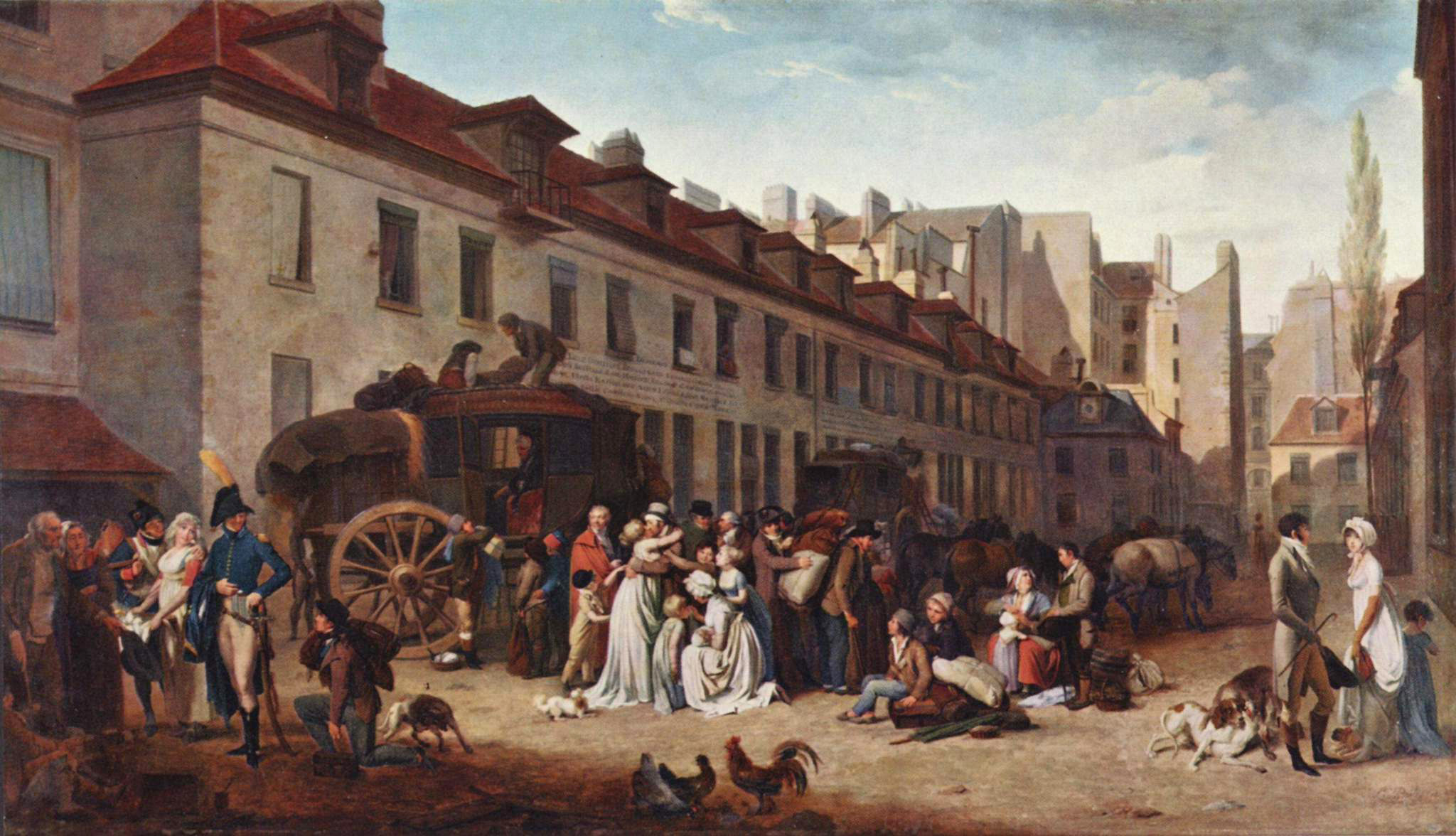
The Arrival of a Stagecoach in the Courtyard of the Messageries by Léopold Boilly (1803)

For most Parisians, the sole means of travel was on foot; the first omnibus did not arrive until 1827. For those with a small amount of money, it was possible to hire a fiacre, a one-horse carriage with a driver which carried either two or four passengers. They were marked with numbers in yellow, had two lanterns at night, and were parked at designated places in the city. The cabriolet, a one-horse carriage with a single seat beside the driver, was quicker but offered little protection from the weather. Altogether there were about two thousand fiacres and cabriolets in Paris during the Empire. The fare was fixed at one franc for a journey, or one franc twenty-five centimes for an hour, and one franc fifty for each hour after that. As the traveler Pierre Jouhaud wrote in 1809: "Independent of the fixed price, one usually gave a small gratuity which the drivers regarded as their proper tribute; and one could not refuse to give it without hearing the driver vomit a torrent of insults. " Wealthier Parisians owned carriages, and well-off foreigners could hire them by the day or month; in 1804 an English visitor hired a carriage and driver for a week for ten Napoleons, or two hundred francs. In all, the narrow streets of Paris were filled with about four thousand private carriages, a thousand carriages for rent, about two thousand fiacres and cabriolets, in addition to thousands of carts and wagons delivering merchandise. There were no police directing traffic, no stop signs, no uniform system of driving on the right or left, no traffic rules, and no sidewalks, which meant both vehicles and pedestrians filled the streets.

== Leisure ==
=== Holidays and festivals ===
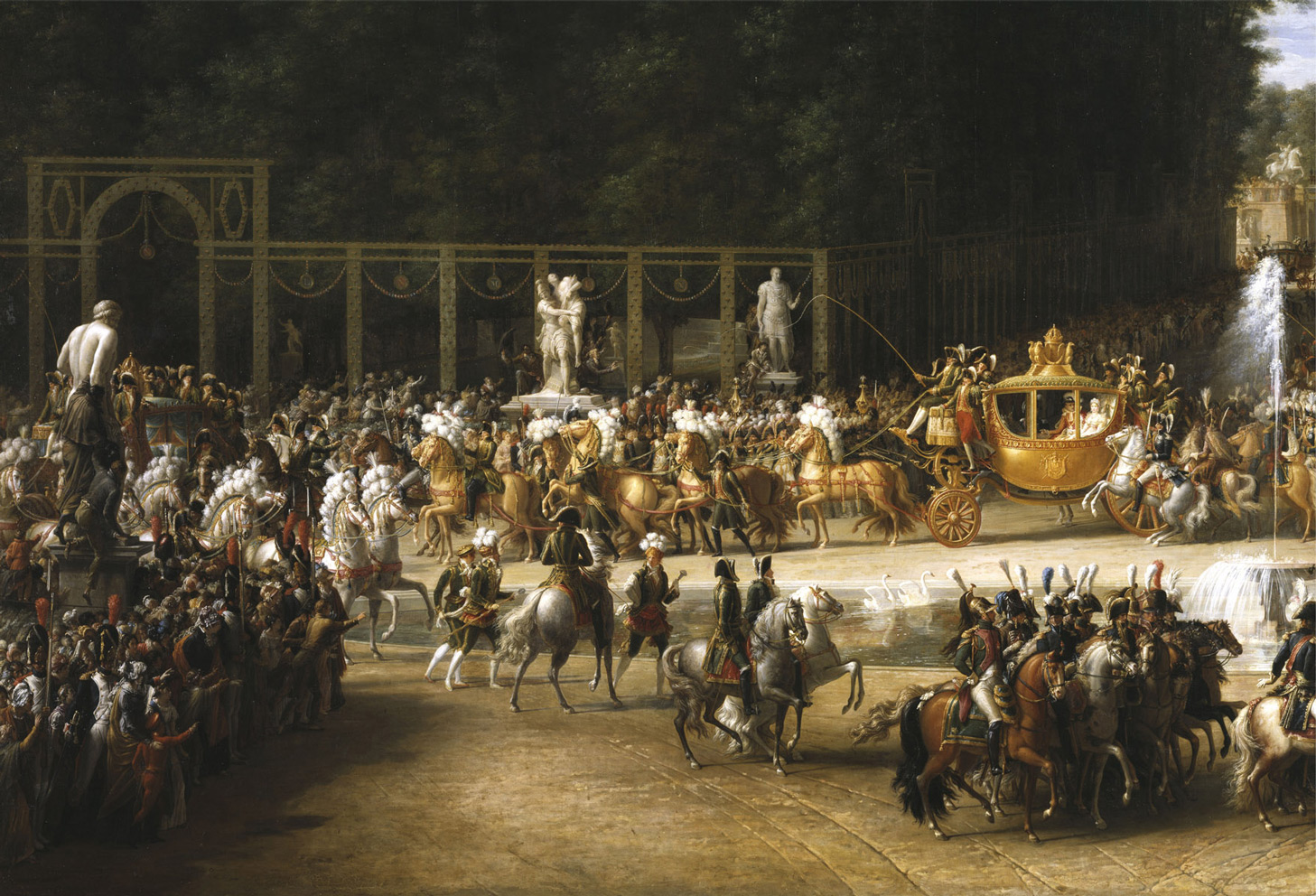
The wedding procession of Napoleon and Marie-Louise of Austria on the Champs-Élysées (1810).

The calendar of Paris under Napoleon was full of holidays and festivals. The first great celebration was devoted to the coronation of the Emperor on 2 December 1804, which was preceded by a procession including Napoleon, Josephine and the Pope through the streets from the Tuileries to the Cathedral of Notre Dame, and followed on December 3 by public dances, tables of food, four fountains filled with wine at the Marché des Innocents, and a lottery giving away thousands of packages of food and wine. . The military victories of the Emperor were given special celebrations with volleys of cannons and military reviews; the victory at the Battle of Austerlitz was celebrated on 22 December 1805; of the Battle of Jena–Auerstedt on 14 October 1805.

The 14th of July 1800. the anniversary of the storming of the Bastille, a solemn holiday after the Revolution, was transformed into the Festival of Concord and Reconciliation, and into a celebration of the Emperor's victory at the Battle of Marengo one month earlier. Its main feature was a grand military parade from the Place de la Concorde to the Champs de Mars, and the laying of the first stone of the foundation of a column dedicated to the armies of the Republic, later raised on Place Vendôme. Napoleon, a champion of order, was not comfortable with a holiday which celebrated a violent revolution. The old battle songs of the Revolution, the Marseillaise and the Chant du Depart were not played at the celebration; they were replaced by Hymne a l'Amour by Gluck. From 1801 to 1804, the 14th of July remained a holiday, but was barely celebrated. In 1805, it ceased to be a holiday, and was not celebrated again until 1880. Another major celebration took place on 2 April 1810 to mark the marriage of Napoleon with his new Empress, Marie-Louise of Austria. Napoleon himself organized the details of the event, which he believed marked his acceptance by the royal families of Europe. It included the first illumination of the monuments and bridges of Paris, as well as arches of triumph and a spectacle on the Champs-Élysées, called "The Union of Mars and Flore"", with 580 costumed actors.

Besides the official holidays, Parisians again celebrated the full range of religious holidays, which had been abolished during the Revolution. The celebration of Carnival, and masked balls, which had been forbidden during the Revolution, resumed, though under careful police supervision. On Mardi Gras thousands of Parisians in masks and costumes filled the streets, on foot, horseback and in carriages. The 15th of August became a new holiday, the Festival of Saint-Napoleon. It marked the birthday of the Emperor, the Catholic festival of the Assumption, and the anniversary of the Concordat, signed by Napoleon and the Pope on that day in 1801, which allowed the churches of France to reopen. In 1806 the Pope was persuaded to make it an official religious holiday, but its celebration ended with the downfall of the Emperor.

=== The Palais-Royal ===
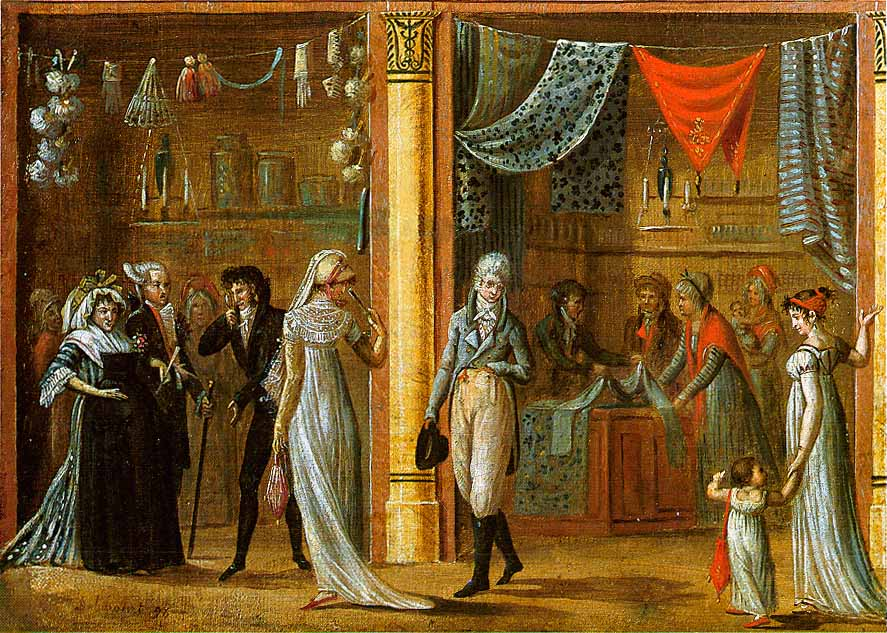
Promenading in the gallery of the Palais-Royal (1798)

It was almost impossible to walk in the narrow streets of Paris, due to the mud and traffic, and the Champs-Élysées did not yet exist, so upper and middle class Parisians took their promenades on the grand boulevards, in the public and private parks and gardens, and above all in the Palais-Royal. The arcades of the Palais-Royal, as described by the German traveler Berkheim in 1807, contained boutiques with glass show windows displaying jewelry, fabrics, hats, perfumes, boots, dresses, paintings, porcelain, watches, toys, lingerie, and every type of luxury goods. In addition there were offices of doctors, dentists and opticians, bookstores, offices for changing money, and salons for dancing, playing billiards and cards. There were fifteen restaurants and twenty-nine cafes, plus stalls which offered fresh waffles from the oven, sweets, cider and beer. The galleries also offered gambling salons and expensive houses of prostitution. The gallery was busy from the early morning, when people came to read the newspapers and do business, and became especially crowded between five and eight in the evening. At eleven, when the shops closed and the theaters finished, a new crowd arrived, along with several hundred prostitutes, seeking clients. The gates were closed at midnight.

=== The Grand Boulevards ===
Next to the Palais-Royal, the most popular places for promenades were the Grands Boulevards, which had, after the Palais-Royal, the greatest concentration of restaurants, theaters, cafes, dance halls, and luxury shops. They were the widest streets in the city, about thirty meters broad, lined with trees and with space for walking and for riding horses, and stretched from la Madeleine to the Bastille. The most crowded part was the Boulevard des Italiens and Boulevard du Temple, where the restaurants and theaters were concentrated. The German traveler Berkheim gave a description of the boulevards as they were in 1807; "It is especially from noon until four or five in the afternoon that the boulevards are the busiest. The elegant people of both sexes promenade there then, showing off their charms and their boredom.". The most best-known landmarks on the boulevards were the Café Hardi, at rue Cerutti, where businessmen gathered, the Café Chinois and Pavillon d'Hannover, a restaurant and bath house in the form of a Chinese temple; and Frascati's at the corner of rue Richelieu and boulevard Montmartre, famous for its ice creams, elegant furnishings and its garden, where in summer, according to Berkheim, gathered "the most elegant and beautiful women of Paris." However, as Berkheim observed, "As everything in Paris is about fashion and fantasy, and since everything that is pleasing at this moment must be, for the same reason, considered fifteen days later to be dull and boring," and therefore once the more chic gardens of Tivoli opened, the fashionable Parisians largely abandoned Frascati for a time and went there. In addition to the theaters, panoramas (see below) and cafes, the sidewalks of the boulevards offered a variety of street theater; puppet shows, dogs dancing to music, and magicians performing.

=== Pleasure gardens and parks ===
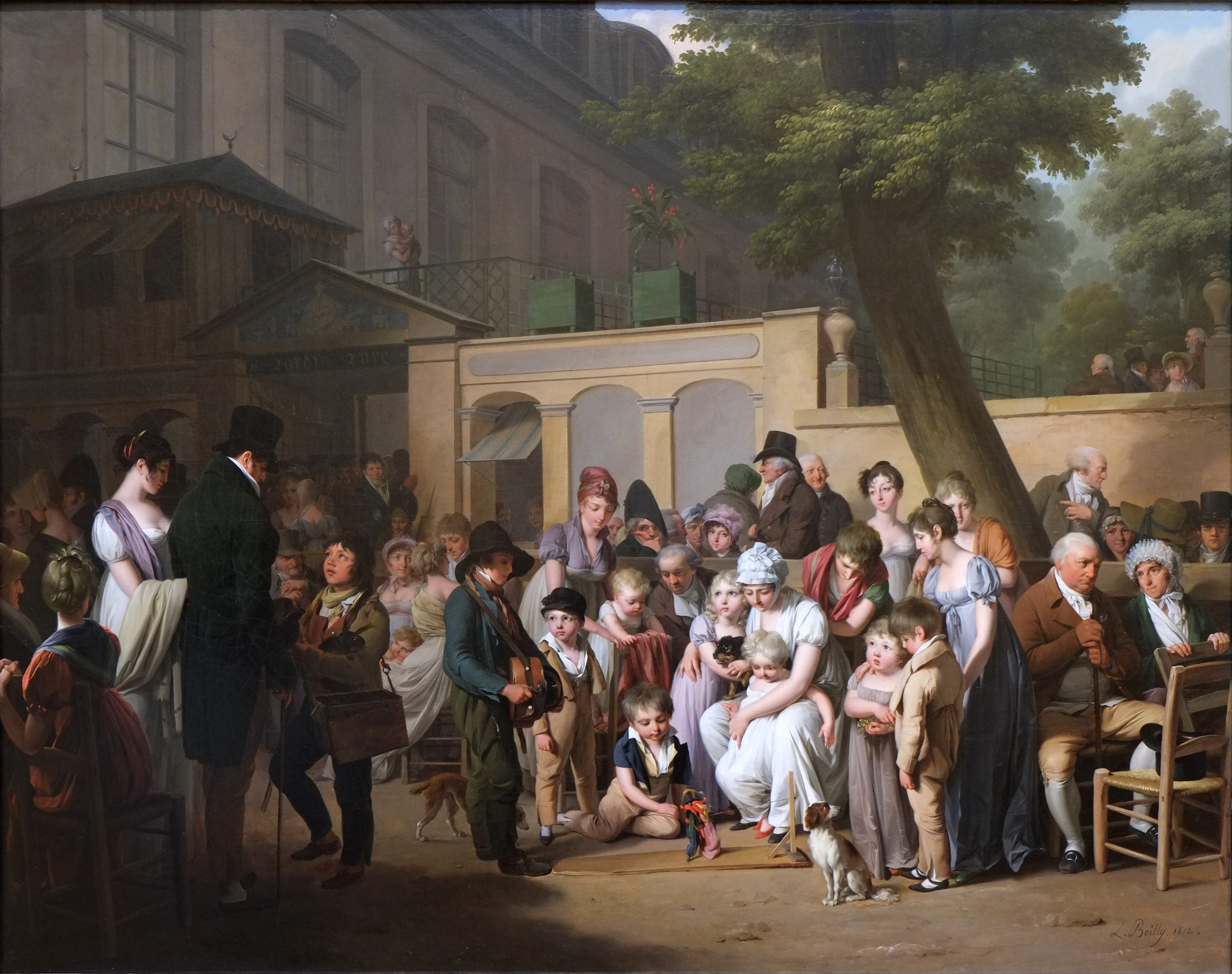
Crowd outside the Jardin Turc, one of the Paris pleasure gardens, by Léopold Boilly (1812).

Pleasure gardens were a popular form of entertainment for the middle and upper classes, where, for an admission charge of twenty sous, visitors could sample ice creams, see pantomimes, acrobatics and jugglers, listen to music, dance, or watch fireworks. The most famous was Tivoli, which opened in 1806 between 66 and 106 on rue Saint-Lazare, where the entrance charge was twenty sous. The Tivoli orchestra helped introduce the waltz, a new dance imported from Germany, to the Parisians. The city had three public parks, the Tuileries Garden, the Luxembourg Garden, and the Jardin des Plantes, all of which were popular with promenaders.

=== The theater and opera ===
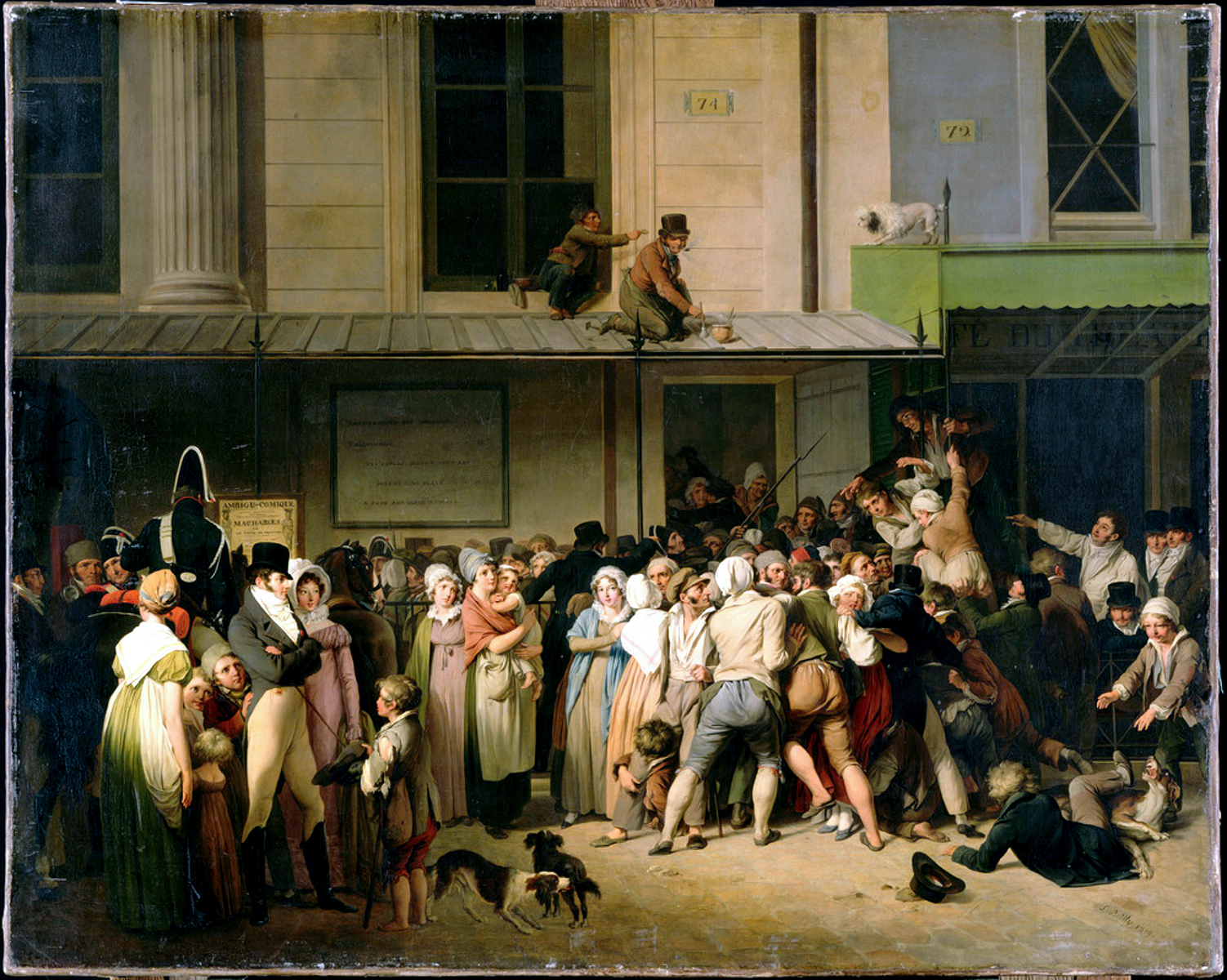
A crowd outside a theater, by Léopold Boilly

The theater was a highly popular form of entertainment for almost all classes of Parisians during the First Empire; there were twenty-one major theaters active, and more smaller stages. At the top of the hierarchy of theaters was the Théâtre Français (today the Comédie-Française), at the Palais-Royal. Only classic French plays were performed there. Tickets ranged in price from 6.60 francs in the first row of boxes down to 1.80 francs for a seat in the upper gallery. Evening dress was required for the premieres of plays. At the other end of the Palais-Royal the Théâtre Montansier, which specialized in vaudeville and comedy. The most expensive ticket there was three francs, and audiences were treated with a program of six different farces and theater pieces. Another highly popular stage was the Théâtre des Variétés on Boulevard Montmartre. on owners of theater regularly invited fifty well-known Paris courtesans to the opening nights, to increase the glamour of the events; the courtesans moved from box to box between acts, meeting their friends and clients.

Napoleon often attended the classical theater, but was disdainful and suspicious of popular theater; he did not permit any opposition or ridicule of the army or of himself. Imperial censors reviewed the scripts of all plays, and on 29 July 1807, he issued a royal decree which reduced the number of theaters from twenty-one to nine.

The Paris Opera at the time performed in the former theater of Montansier on rue Richelieu, facing the National Library. It was the largest hall in the city, with one thousand seven hundred seats. The aisles and corridors were narrow, the air circulation was minimal, it was badly-lit and had poor visibility, but it was nearly always full. It was not only the rich who attended the opera; seats were available for as little as fifty centimes. Napoleon, as a Corsican, he had a strong preference for Italian opera, and he was suspicious of any other kind. In 1805, he wrote from his army camp at Boulogne to Fouché, his chief of police, "What is this piece called Don Juan which they want to perform at the Opera?" When he attended a performance, the orchestra played a special fanfare for his entry and his departure. The Opera was also noted for its masked balls, which attracted a large and enthusiastic public.

=== Panoramas ===
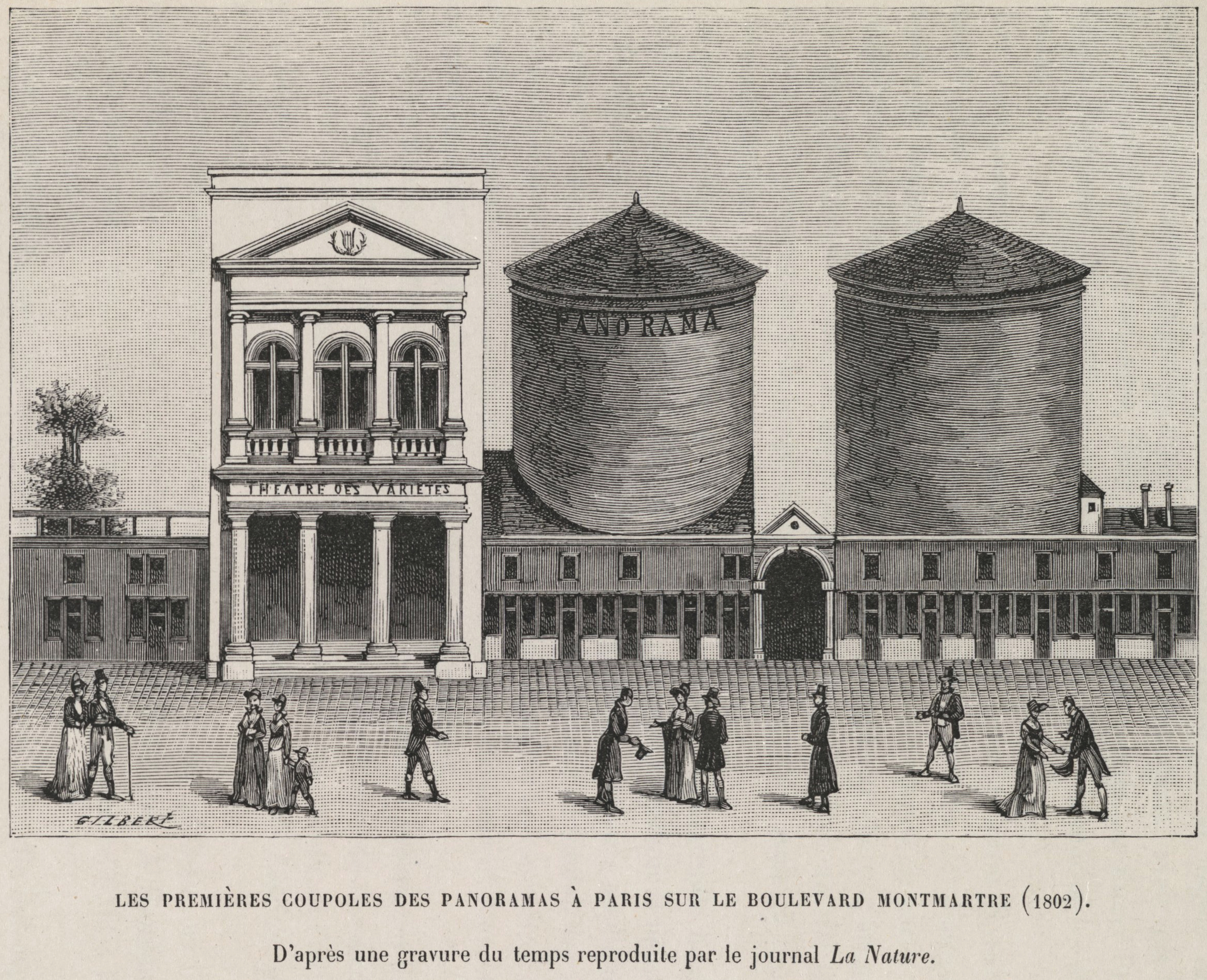
The Théâtre des Variétés (left) and two Panoramas (1802)

Panoramic paintings, large-scale paintings mounted in a circular room to give a 360-degree view of a city or an historic event, were very popular in Paris at the beginning of the Empire. The American inventor, Robert Fulton, who was in Paris to try to sell his inventions, the steamboat, a submarine and a torpedo, to Napoleon, bought the patent in 1799 from the inventor of the panorama, the English artist Robert Barker, and opened the first panorama in Paris in July 1799; it was a Vue de Paris by the painters Constant Bourgeois, Denis Fontaine and Pierre Prévost. Prévost went on to make a career of painting panoramas, making eighteen before his death in 1823. Three rotundas were built on boulevard Montmartre between 1801 and 1804 to show panoramic paintings of Rome, Jerusalem, and other cities. They gave their name to the Passage des Panoramas, where they were located

=== The Guinguettes ===
While the upper and middle class went to the pleasure garden, the working class went to the guinguette. These were cafes and cabarets located just outside the city limits and customs barriers, open on Sundays and holidays, where wine was untaxed and cheaper, and there were three or four musicians playing for dancing. They were most numerous in the villages of Belleville, Montmartre, Vaugirard and Montrouge.

== Fashion ==
=== Women ===
Women's fashion during the Empire was set to a large degree by the Empress Joséphine de Beauharnais and her favorite designer, Hippolyte Leroy, who was inspired by the Roman statues of the Louvre and the frescoes of Pompeii. Fashions were also guided by a new magazine, the Journal des Dames et des Modes, with illustrations by the leading artists of the day. The antique Roman style, introduced during the Revolution, continued to be popular but was modified because Napoleon disliked immodesty in women's clothing; low necklines and bare arms were banned. The waist of the Empire gowns was very high, almost under the arms, with a long pleated skirt down to the feet. Corsets were abandoned, and the preferred fabric was mousseline. The main fashion accessory for women was the shawl, inspired by the Orient, made of cashmere or silk, covering the arms and shoulders. Napoleon's military campaigns also influenced fashion; after the Egyptian campaign, women began to wear turbans; after the Spanish campaign, tunics with high shoulders; and after the campaigns in Prussia and Poland, Polish furs and a long coat called a pelisse. They also wore jackets inspired by military uniforms, with epaulettes. In cold weather women wore a redingote, from the English word "riding coat", borrowed from men's fashion, or, after 1808, a witchoura, a fur coat with a hood.

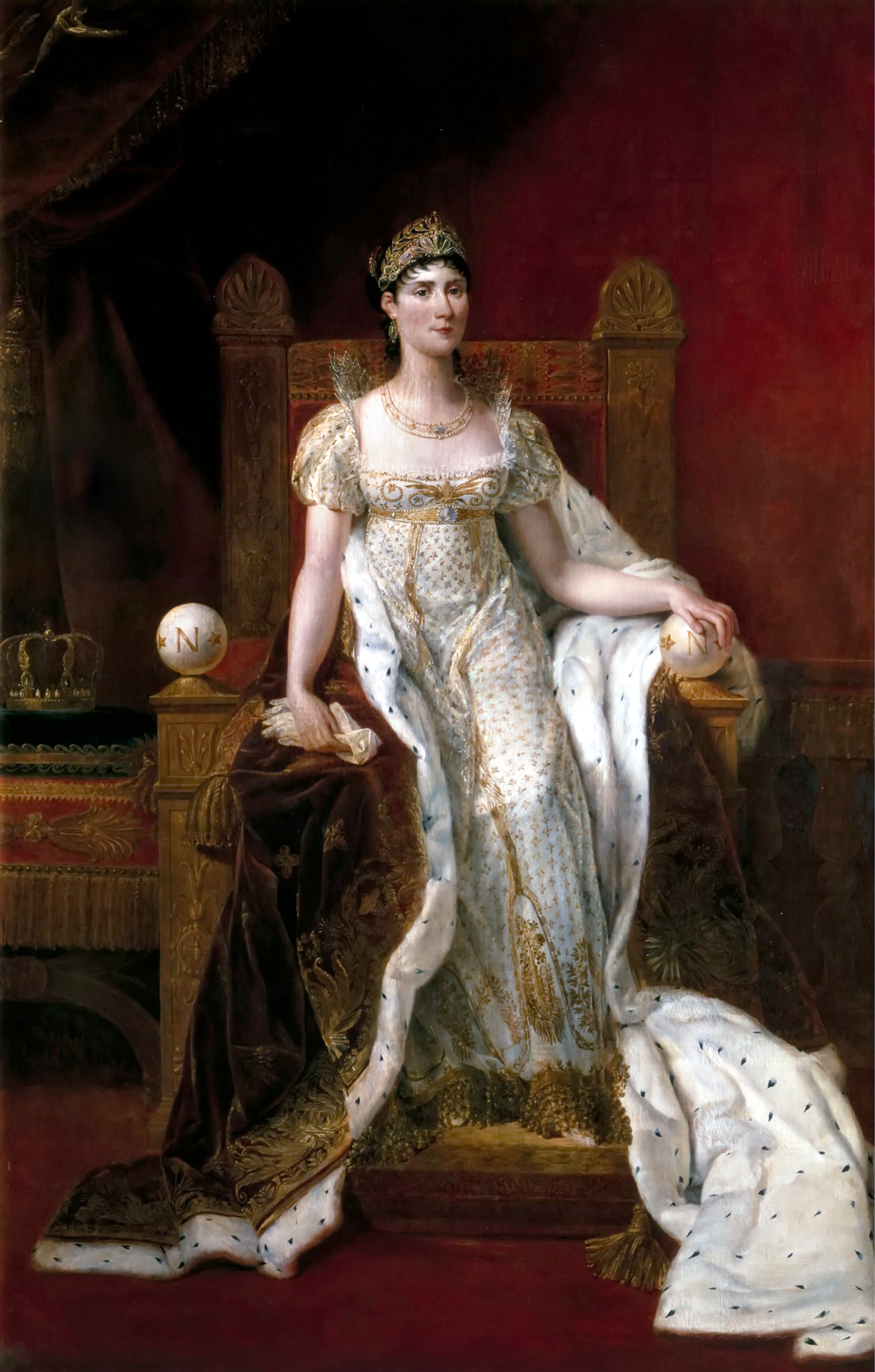
More than anyone else, the Empress Josephine set the fashion style of the Empire (1807)

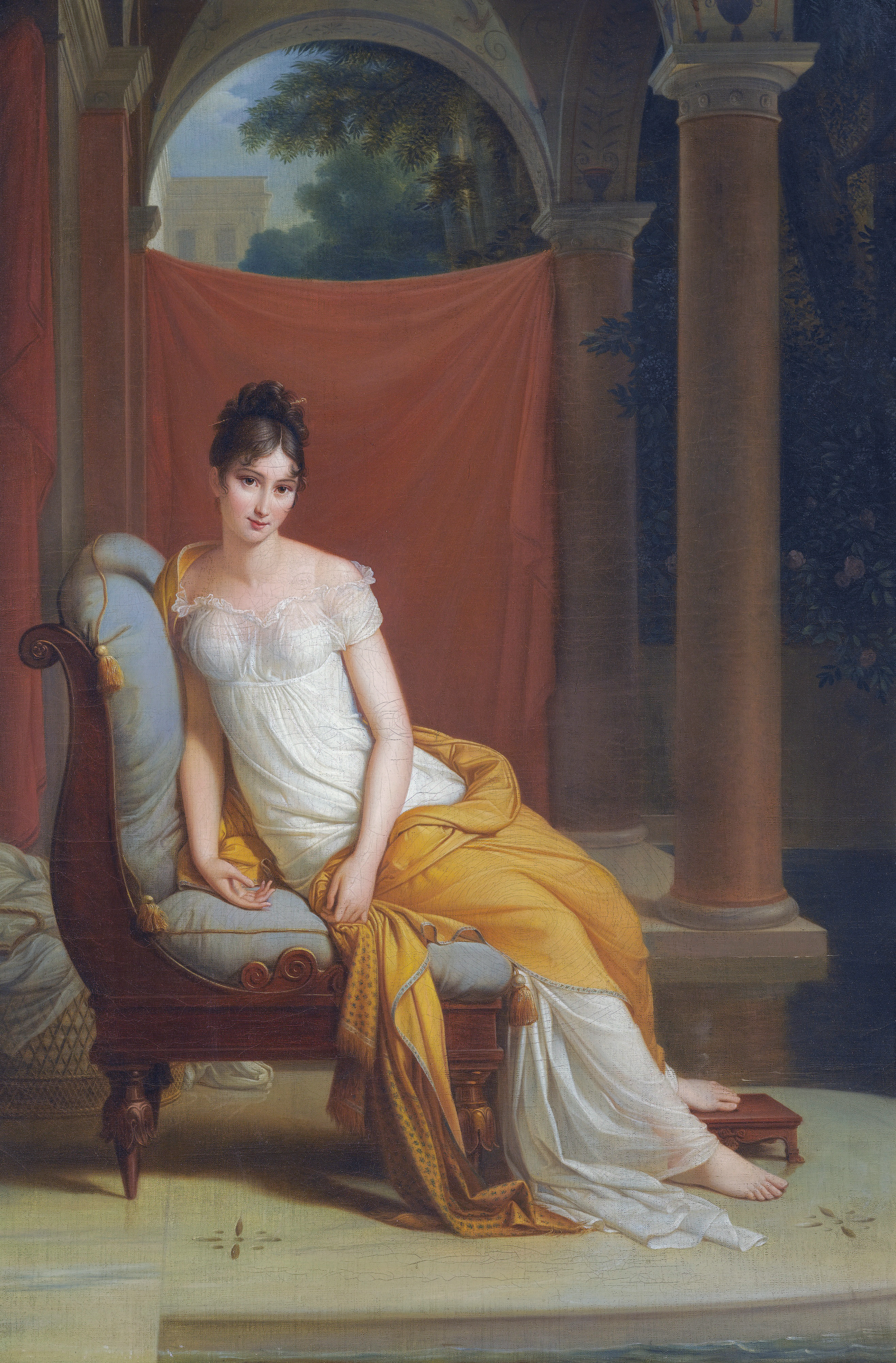
Juliette Récamier, by François Gérard (1807)

Madame Riviere, by Jean-Auguste-Dominique Ingres (1805)

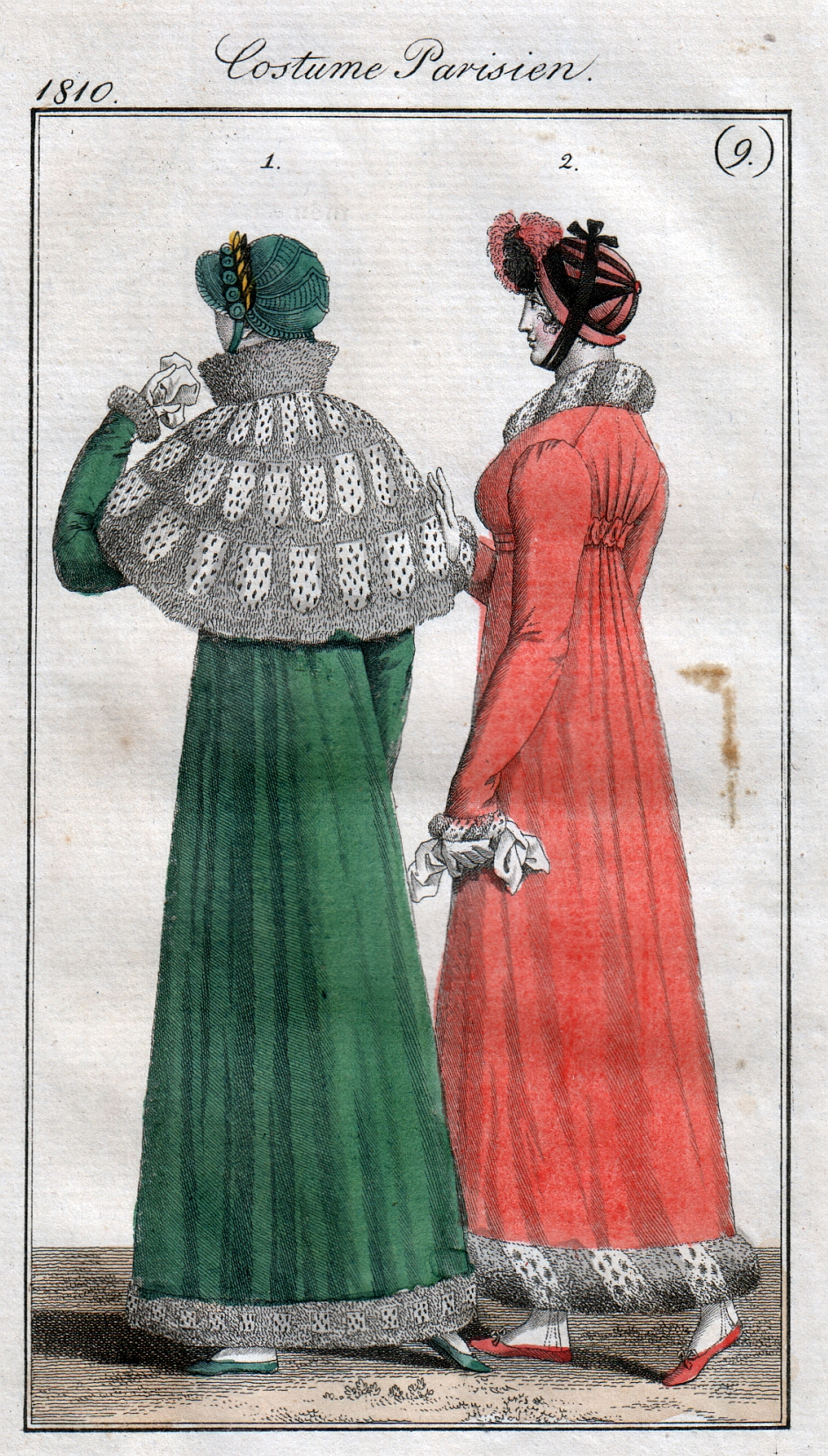
Parisian fashions (1810)

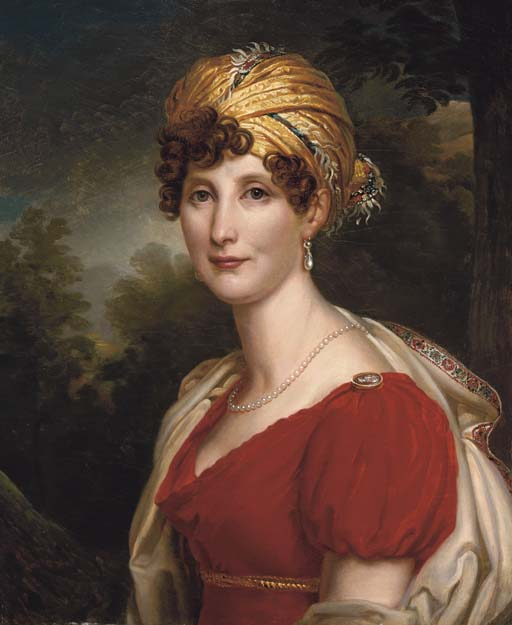
Portrait of Eleanore de Montmorency. (1810) The turban became popular after Napoleon's Egyptian campaign.

=== Men ===
During the Revolution, the culotte, or short trousers with silk stockings, and the extravagance fashions, lace and bright colors of the nobility had disappeared, and were replaced by trousers and greater simplicity. The purpose of men's fashion was to show one's wealth and social position; colors were dark and sober. Under the Empire, the culotte returned, worn by Napoleon and his nobles and the wealthy, but trousers were also worn. Men's fashion was strongly influenced by the French aristocrats who returned from exile in England; they introduced English styles, including the large overcoat they called the carsick, going down to the feet; the jacket with a collar going up to the ears; a white silk necktie wrapped around the neck; an English high hat with a broad brim, and high boots. In the late Empire, men's fashion tried for a more military look, with a narrow waist and a chest expanded by several layers of vests.

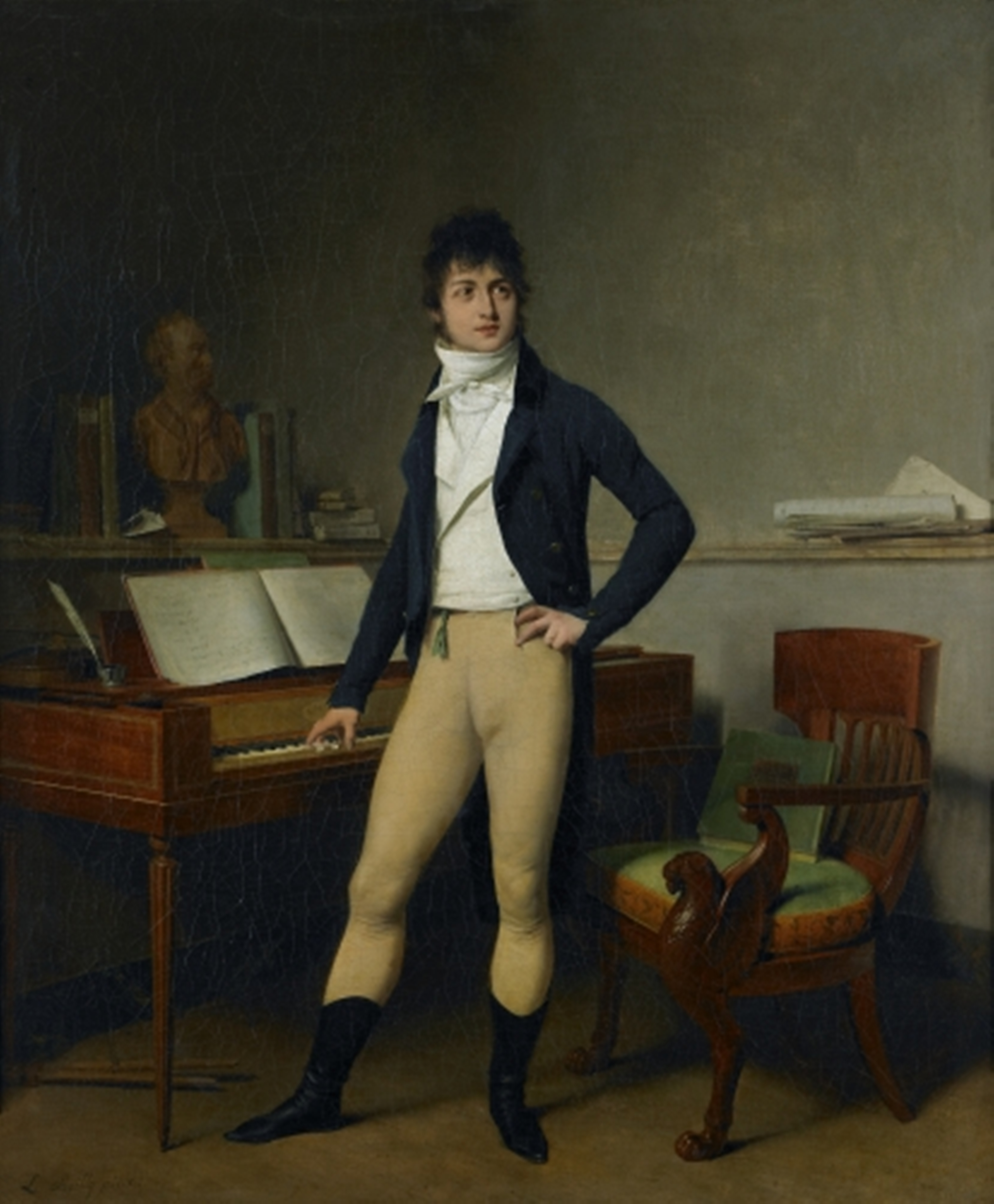
Portrait of a gentleman by Léopold Boilly, about 1800.

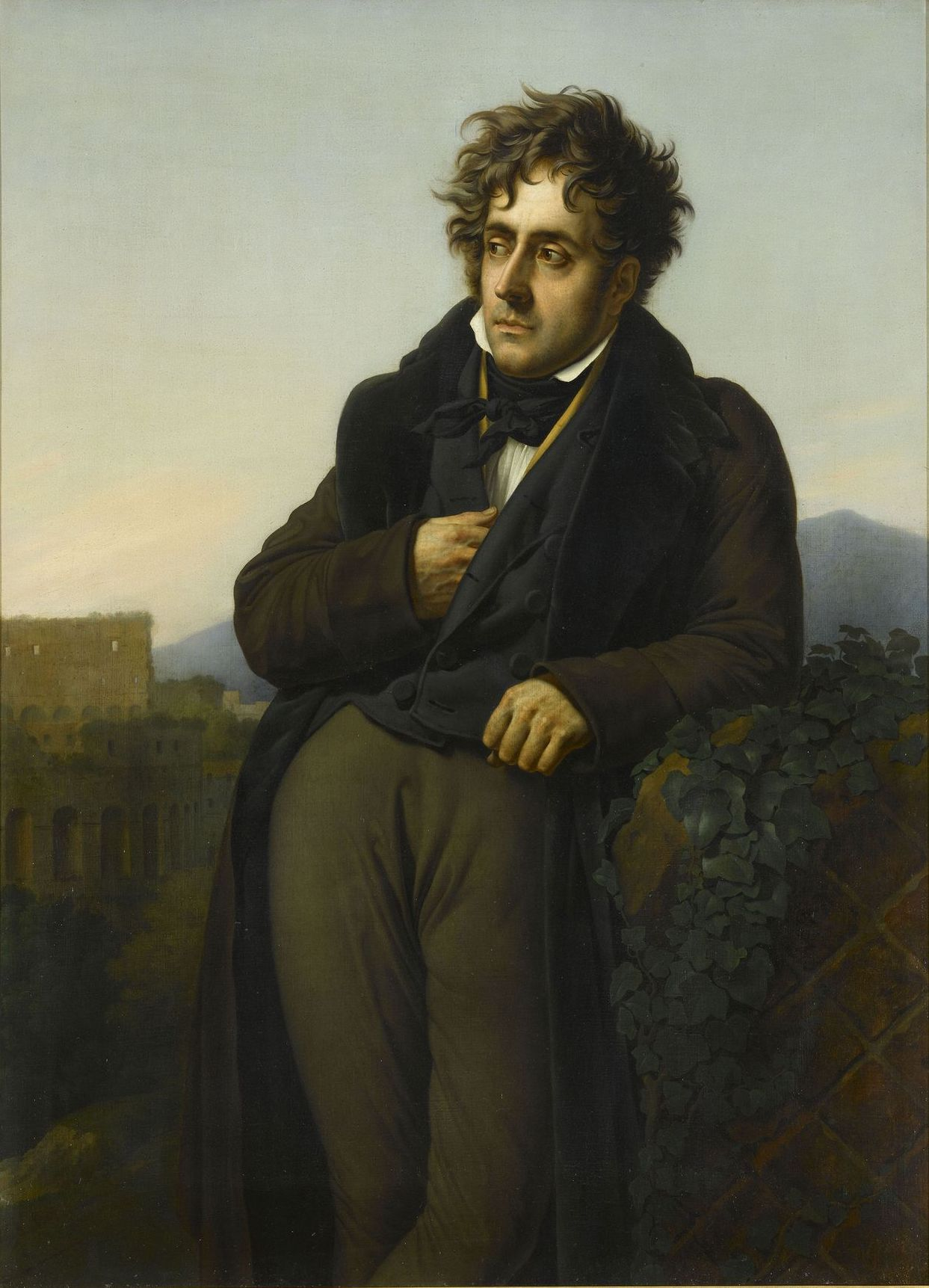
Portrait of Chateaubriand by Girodet in 1809

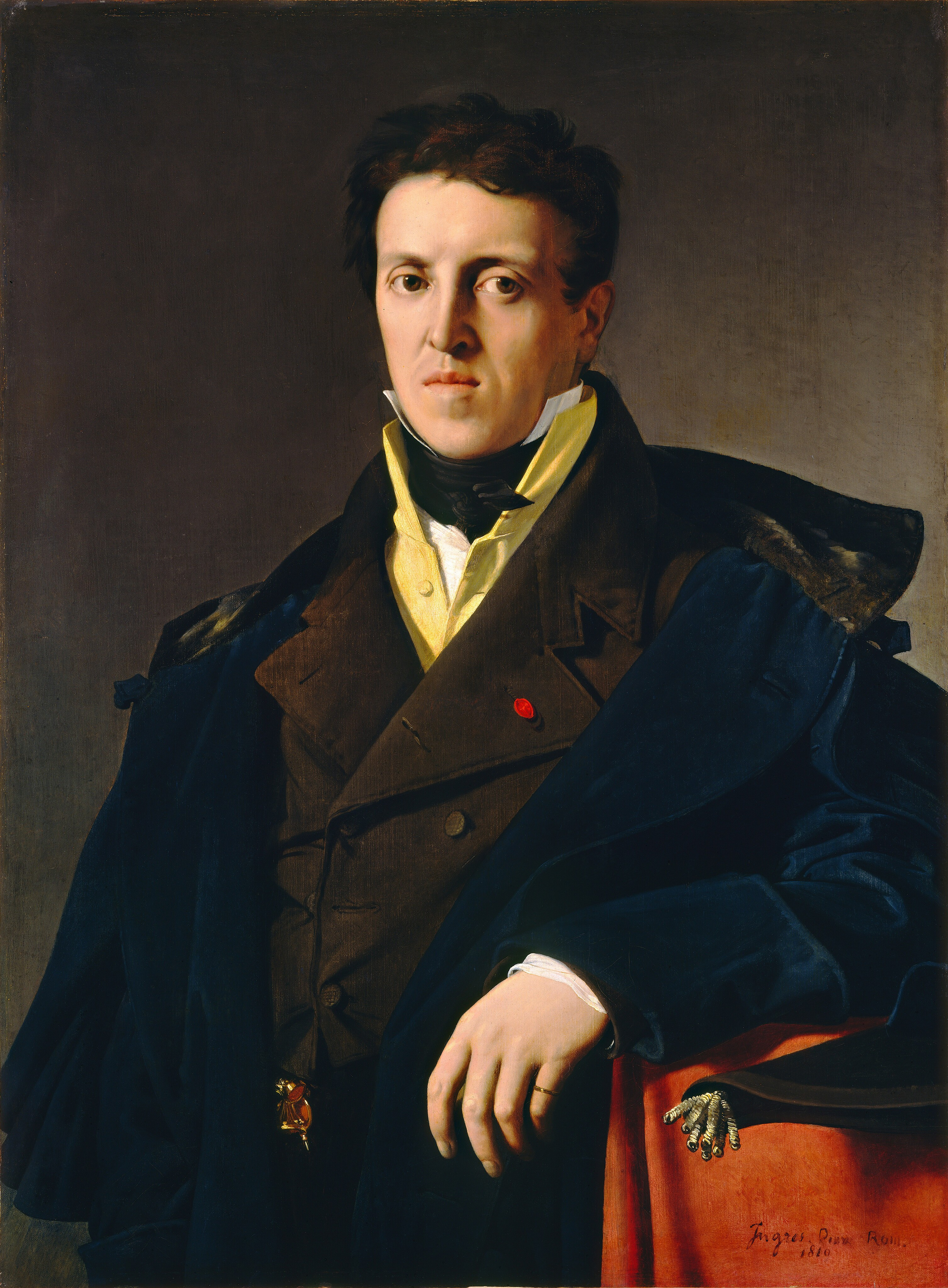
A Parisian gentleman, painted by Ingres (1810).

== Daily life ==
=== Food and drink ===
The staple of the Parisian diet was bread; unlike rural France, where peasants ate dark bread, baked weekly, Parisians preferred a spongy white bread with a firm crust, fresh from the oven, which they commonly ate by soaking it in a meat bouillon. It was similar to the modern baguette, not invented until the 20th century, but took longer to make. Parisians ate an average of 500 grams of bread, or two loaves a day; laborers consumed four loaves a day. Napoleon wanted to avoid the popular uprisings of 1789 caused by bread shortages, so the price of bread was strictly controlled between 1800 and 1814, and was much lower than outside the city. Parisians were very attached to their variety of bread; in times of grain shortages, when the government attempted to substitute cheaper dark breads, the Parisians refused to buy them.

Meat was the other main staple of the diet, mostly beef, mutton and pork. There were 580 butchers registered in Paris in 1801, and prices of meat, like bread, were strictly regulated. Fish was another important part of the Parisian diet, particularly fresh fish from the Atlantic, brought to the city from the ports on the coast. Consumption of fresh fish grew during the First Empire, amounting to 55 percent of fish consumption, and it gradually replaced the salted fish which had previously been an important part of the diet, but which were harder to obtain due to the long war at sea between England and France. Seafood accounted for only about ten percent of what Parisians spent on meat; and was slightly less than what they spent on poultry and game.

Cheeses and eggs were only a small part of the Parisian diet, since there was no adequate refrigeration and no rapid way to deliver them to the city. The most common cheeses were those of the nearest region, Brie, and then those from Normandy. Fresh fruits and vegetables from the Paris region, potatoes, and dried vegetables, such as lentils and white beans, completed the diet.

Wine was a basic part of the Parisian diet, ranking with bread and meat. Fine wines arrived from Bordeaux, ordinary wines were brought to the city in large casks from Burgundy and Provence; lesser quality wines came from vineyards just outside the city, in Montmartre and Belleville. Beer consumption was small, was only eight percent of that of wine, and cider only three percent. The most common strong alcoholic beverage was eau-de-vie, with as much as twenty-seven percent alcohol. It was most popular among the working class Parisians.

Coffee had been introduced to Paris in about 1660, and came from Martinique and the IÎe de Bourbon, now Réunion. The English blockade of French ports cut off the supply, and Parisians were forced to drink substitutes made from the chicory or acorns. The blockade also cut off the supplies of chocolate, tea and sugar. Napoleon encouraged the growing of sugar beets to replace cane sugar, and in February 1812 he went himself to taste the products of the first sugar beet refineries opened just outside the city, at Passy and Chaillot.

=== Cafés and restaurants ===
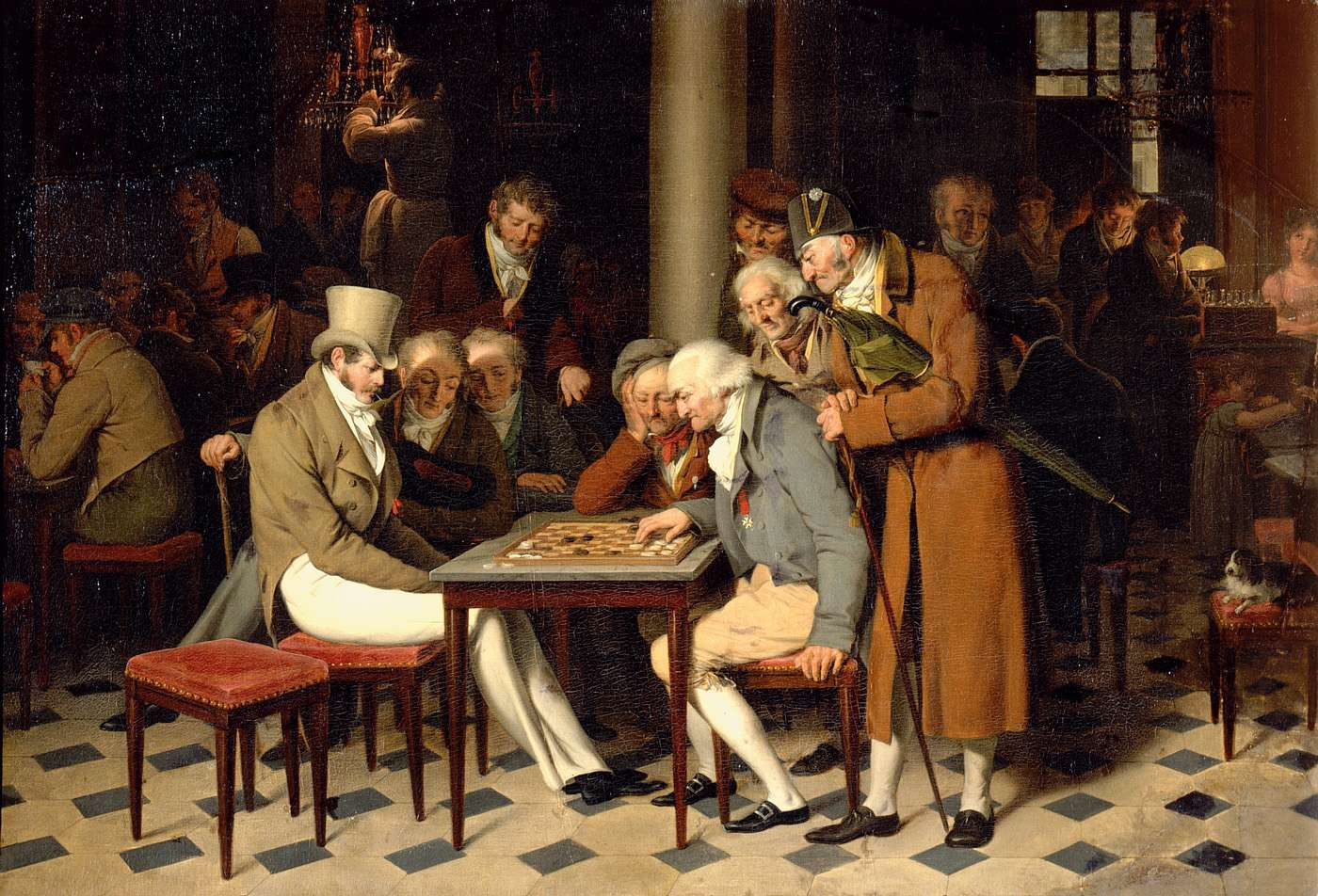
A game of checkers in the Café Lamblin in the Palais-Royal, by Boilly (before 1808)

There were more than four thousand cafés in Paris in 1807, but due to the English naval blockade they were rarely able to obtain coffee, sugar, or rum, their main staples. Many of them were transformed into glaciers, which served ice cream and sorbet. One of the most prominent was the Café de Paris, located next to the statue of Henry IV on the Pont Neuf, facing Place Dauphine. The other well-known cafés were clustered in the galleries of the Palais Royal; these included the Café de Foix, the Café de Chartres, the Café de la Rotonde, which had a pavilion in the garden; the Café Corazza, where one could find newspapers from around Europe; and the Café des Mille Colonnes. The German traveler Berkheim described Café Foix: "this café, which normally brings together only high society, is always full, especially after the performances of the Théâtre français and the Montansier. They take their ice creams and sorbets there; and very rarely does one find any women among them."

In the cellars beneath the Palais Royal were several other cafés for a less aristocratic clientele, where one could eat a full meal for twenty-five centimes and enjoy a show; The Café Sauvage had dancers in exotic costumes from supposedly primitive countries; the Café des Aveugles had an orchestra of blind musicians; and the Café des Variétés had musicians in one grotto and vaudeville theater performances in another. Berkheim wrote: "The society is very mixed; composed ordinarily of petit bourgeois, workers, soldiers, servants, and women with large round bonnets and large skirts of wool... there is a continual movement of people coming and going."

The first restaurants in the modern sense, with elaborate cuisine and service, had appeared in Paris just before the Revolution. By 1807, according to Berkheim, there were about two thousand restaurants in Paris in 1807, of all categories. Most of the highest-quality and most expensive restaurants were located in the Palais-Royal; these included Beauvilliers, Brigaud, Legacque, Léda, and Grignon. Others were on the boulevards de Temple or Italiens. The Rocher de Cancale, known for its oysters, was on rue Montorgueil near the markets of Les Halles, while Ledoyen was at the western edge of the city, on the Champs-Élysées.

The menu of one restaurant, Véry, described by the German traveler August Kotzebue in 1804, gives an idea of the cuisine of the top restaurants; it began with a choice of nine kinds of soup, followed by seven kinds of pâté, or platters of oysters; then twenty-seven kinds of hors d'oeuvres, mostly cold, including sausages, marinated fish, or choucroute. The main course followed, a boiled meat with a choice of twenty sauces, or a choice of almost any possible variety of a beefsteak. After this was a choice of twenty-one entrées of poultry or wild birds, or twenty-one dishes of veal or mutton; then a choice of twenty-eight different fish dishes; then a choice of fourteen different roast birds; accompanied by a choice of different entremets, including asparagus, peas, truffles, mushrooms, crayfish or compotes. After this came a choice of thirty-one different desserts. The meal was accompanied by a choice made of twenty-two red wines and seventeen white wines; and afterwards came coffee and a selection of sixteen different liqueurs.

The city had many more modest restaurants, where one could dine for 1.50 francs, without wine. Employees with small salaries could find many restaurants which served a soup and main course, with bread and a carafe of wine, for between fifteen and twenty-one francs a week, with two courses with bread and a carafe. For students in the Left Bank, there were restaurants like Flicoteau, on rue de la Parcheminerie, which had no tablecloths or napkins, where diners ate at long tables with benches, and the menu consisted of bowls of bouillon with pieces of meat. Diners usually brought their own bread, and paid five or six centimes for their meal.

== Religion ==
Just fifty days after seizing power, on 28 December 1799, Napoleon took measures to establish better relations with the Catholic Church in Paris. All the churches which had not yet been sold as national property or torn down, fourteen in number in January 1800, with four added during the year, were to be returned to religious use. Eighteen months later, with the signing of the Concordat between Napoleon and the Pope, churches were allowed to hold mass, ring their bells, and priests could appear in their religious attire on the streets. After the Reign of Terror, priests were hard to find in Paris; of 600 priests who had taken the oath to the government in 1791, only 75 remained in 1800. Many had to be brought to the city from the provinces to bring the number up to 280. When the bishop of Paris died in 1808, Napoleon tried to appoint his uncle, Cardinal Fesch, to the position, but Pope Pious VII, in conflict with Napoleon over other matters, rejected him. Fesch withdrew his candidacy and another ally of Napoleon, Bishop Maury, took his place until Napoleon's downfall in 1814.

The number of Protestants in Paris under the Empire was very small; Napoleon accorded three churches for the Calvinists and one church for the Lutherans. The Jewish religious community was also very small, with 2733 members in 1808. They did not have a formal temple until 1822, after the Empire, with the inauguration of the synagogue on rue Notre-Dame-du-Nazareth.

== Education ==
=== Schools, collèges and lycées ===
During Old Regime, the education of young Parisians until university age was done by the Catholic church. The Revolution destroyed the old system, but did not have time to create a new one. Lucien Bonaparte, the Minister of the Interior, went to work to create a new system. A bureau of public instruction for the prefecture of the Seine was established on 15 February 1804. Charity schools for poorer children were registered, and had a total of eight thousand students, and were mostly taught by Catholic brothers. An additional four hundred schools for middle class and wealthy Parisian students, numbering fourteen thousand, were registered. An 1802 law formalized a system of collèges and lycées for older children. The principal subjects taught were mathematics and Latin, with a smaller number of hours given to Greek, and one hour of French a week, history, and a half-hour of geography a week. Arithmetic, geometry and physics were the only sciences taught. Philosophy was added as a subject in 1809. About eighteen hundred students, mostly from the most wealthy and influential families, attended the four most famous lycées in Paris in 1809; the Imperial (now Louis le Grand); Charlemagne; Bonaparte (now Condorcet); and Napoléon (now Henry IV). These competed with a large number of private academies and schools.

=== The university and the Grandes Écoles ===
The University of Paris before the Revolution had been most famous as a school of theology, charged with enforcing religious orthodoxy; it was closed in 1792, and was not authorized to re-open until 1808, with five faculties; theology, law, medicine, mathematics, physics and letters. Napoleon made it clear what its purpose was, in a letter to the rectors in 1811; "the University does not have as its sole purpose to train orators and scientists; above all it owes to the Emperor the creation of faithful and devoted subjects.". In the academic year 1814–15, it had a total of just 2500 students; 70 in letters, 55 in sciences, 600 in medicine, 275 in pharmacy, and 1500 in law. The law students were being trained to be magistrates, lawyers, notaries and other administrators of the Empire. A degree in law took three years, or four to earn a doctorate, and cost students about one thousand francs; a degree in theology required 110 francs, in letters or sciences, 250 francs.

While he tolerated the university, the schools that Napoleon valued the most were the École Militaire, the military school, and the Grandes Écoles, which had been founded at the end of the old regime or during the Revolutionary period; the Conservatoire national des arts et métiers; the École des Ponts et Chausées, (Bridges and highways); the École des Mines de Paris (school of Mines), the École Polytechnique, and the École Normale Supérieure, which trained the engineers, officers, teachers, administrators and organizers he wanted for the Empire. He re-organized them, often militarized them, and gave them the highest prestige in the French educational system.

== Books and the press ==
Freedom of the press had been proclaimed at the beginning of the Revolution, but had quickly disappeared during the Reign of Terror, and was not restored by the succeeding governments or by Napoleon. In 1809, Napoleon told his Council of State: "The printing presses are an arsenal, and should not be put at the disposition of anyone...The right to publish is not a natural right; printing as a form of instruction is a public function, and therefore the State can prevent it." Supervision of the press was the responsibility of the Ministry of the Police, which had separate bureaus to oversee newspapers, plays, publishers and printers, and bookstores. The Prefecture of Police had its own bureau which also kept an eye on printers, bookstores and newspapers. All books published had to be approved by the censors, and between 1800 and 1810 one-hundred sixty titles were banned and seized by the police. The number of bookstores in Paris dropped from 340 in 1789 to 302 in 1812; in 1811 the number of publishing houses was limited by law to no more than eighty, almost all in the neighborhood around the University.

Censorship of newspapers and magazines was even stricter. in 1800 Napoleon closed down sixty political newspapers, leaving just thirteen. In February 1811 he decided that this was still too many, and reduced the number to just eight newspapers, almost supporting him. One relatively independent paper, the Journal de l'Empire continued to exist, and by 1812 was the most popular newspaper, with 32,000 subscriptions. Newspapers were also heavily taxed, and subscriptions were expensive; an annual subscription cost about 56 francs in 1814. Because of the high cost of newspapers, many Parisians went to cabinets litteraires or reading salons, which numbered about one hundred and fifty. For a subscription of about six francs a month, readers could find a selection of newspapers, plus billiards, cards or chess games. Some salons displayed caricatures of the leading figures of the day.

== The arts ==
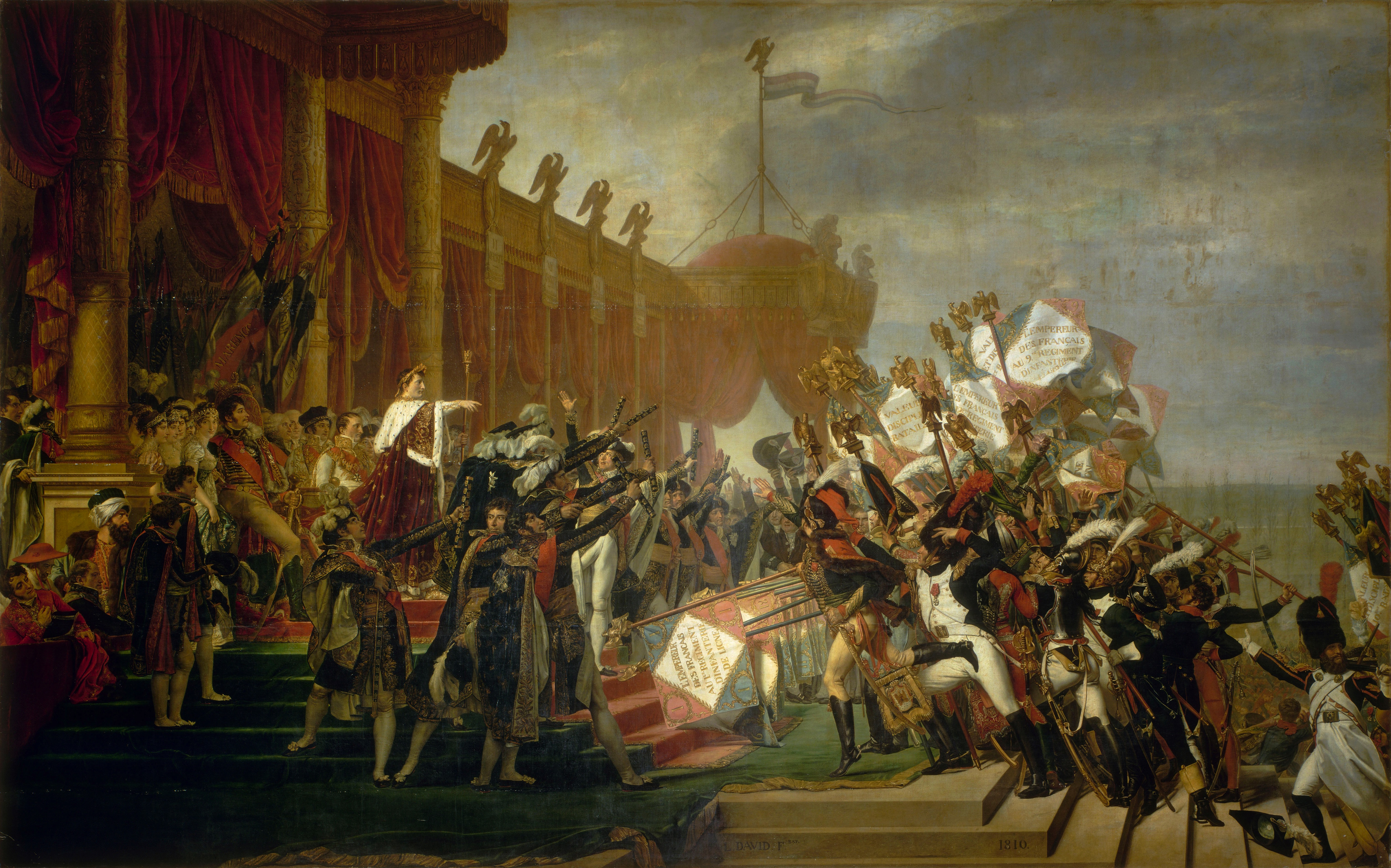
The Army Takes an oath to the Emperor by Jacques-Louis David, shown at the Salon of 1810. David removed Josephine from the painting, after Napoleon divorced her.

Napoleon supported the arts, as long as the artists supported him. He gave substantial commissions to painters, sculptors and even poets to depict his family and the great moments of the Empire. The principal showcase for paintings was the Paris Salon, which had been started in 1667 and from 1725 took place in the Salon carré of the Louvre, from which it took its name. It was an annual event from 1795 until 1801, then was held every two years. It usually opened in September or October, and as the number of paintings grew, it occupied both the Salon carré and the Gallery of Apollo. In 1800, 651 paintings were shown; in 1812, 1,353 paintings were on display. The stars of the salon were the history painters, Pierre-Narcisse Guérin, Antoine-Jean Gros, Jacques-Louis David, Anne-Louis Girodet de Roussy-Trioson and Pierre-Paul Prud'hon, who painted large canvases of the events of the Empire and the heroes and heroines of ancient Rome. The Salon was one of the major social events of the year, and attracted huge crowds. The salon had its own political sensitivities; On 22 October 1808 the director of the Louvre, Vivant Denon, hid a portrait of the writer and philosopher François-René de Chateaubriand when the Emperor visited the Salon, since Chateaubriand had criticized the Emperor. Knowing what had been done, Napoleon asked to see it. The divorce of Napoleon and Josephine in 1810 was an even more sensitive subject; she had to be removed from the paintings in the salon where she was portrayed. David removed her from his work The Distribution of the Eagles, leaving an empty space; the painter Jean-Baptiste Regnault, however, refused to take her out of his painting of the wedding of Jérôme Bonaparte.

The most popular art market in Paris was the gallery of the Palais-Royal, where more than fifty artists had their small studios and showrooms. The artists in the Gallery worked for a wide clientele; Parisians could have their portrait painted for thirty francs, or a profile for twelve francs. Many of the artists also had their residences there, on the fifth floor.

== The end of the Empire ==
=== The Battle of Paris ===
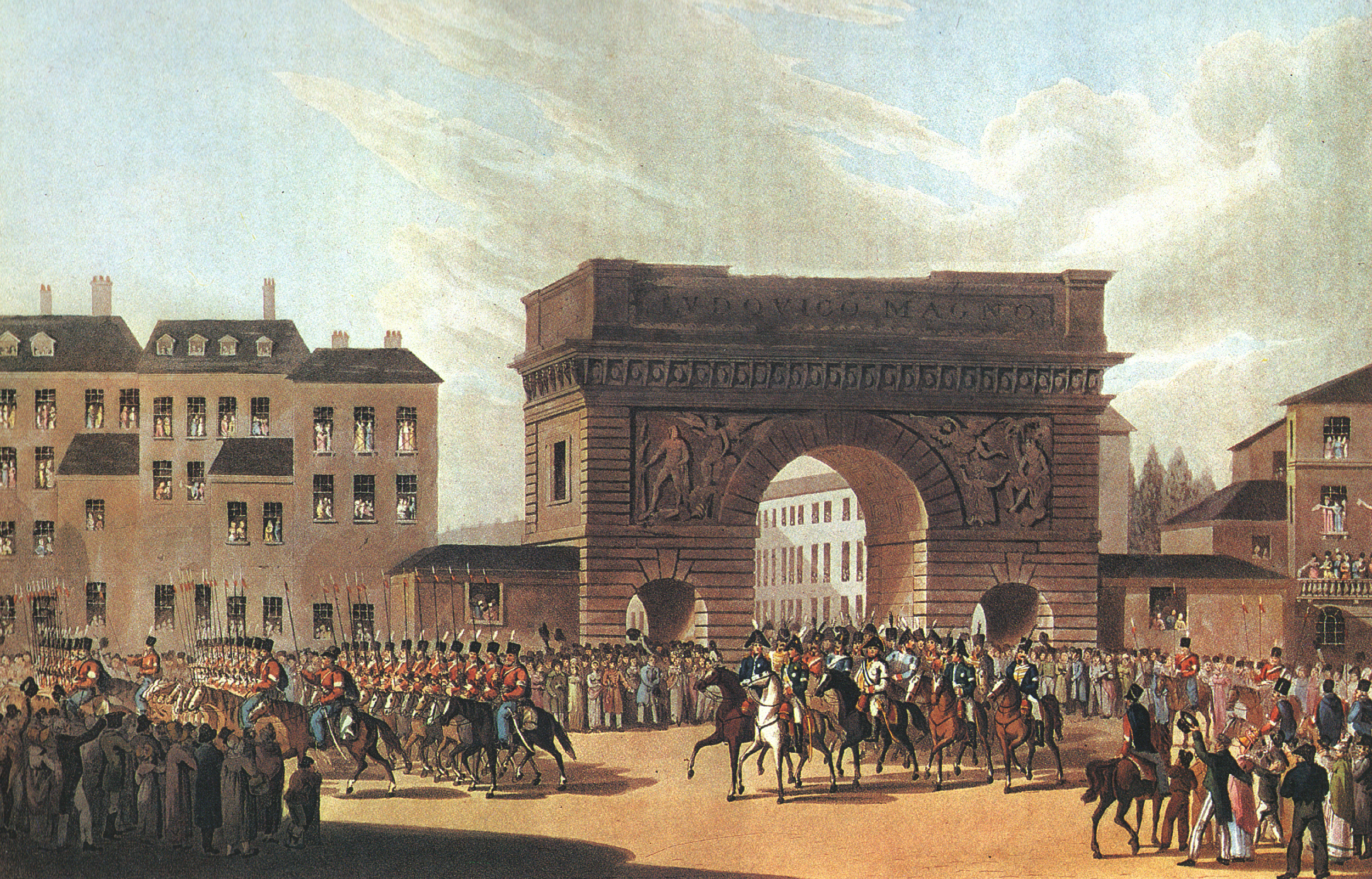
The Russian army, led by Czar Alexander I, enters Paris by the Port Saint-Denis on 31 March 1814

In January 1814, after Napoleon's decisive defeat at the Battle of Leipzig in October 1813, the Allied armies of Austria, Prussia and Russia, with over five hundred thousand men, invaded France and headed for Paris. Napoleon departed the Tuileries Palace for the front on January 24, leaving behind the Empress and his son; he never saw them again. He commanded only seventy thousand men, but managed a skillful campaign. . Within Paris, most Parisians were desperately tired of the war. Since the time of Louis XIV, Paris had no walls or other major defensive works. Napoleon's own former foreign minister, Prince Talleyrand, was in secret communication with Czar Alexander I; on March 10 he wrote to him, saying that Paris was undefended, and urging him to march directly to the city.

On 29 March, the Empress Marie-Louise and her son, escorted by 1200 soldiers of the Old Guard, left Paris, heading for the Chateau of Blois in the Loire Valley. On March 30, a combined Russian, Austrian and Prussian army with 57,000 soldiers under Karl Philipp, Prince of Schwarzenberg, attacked Paris, which was defended by Marshal Auguste de Marmont and Marshal Édouard Mortier, duc de Trévise, with forty-one thousand men. Schwarzenberg sent a message to the French commanders, threatening to destroy the city if they did not surrender. After a day of bitter but indecisive fighting in Montmartre, Belleville, at the barriers of Clichy and Patin and the quarries of the Buttes de Chaumont, with about seven thousand soldiers killed on each side, Mortier marched his remaining troops southwest out of the city, while Marmont, with eleven thousand men, entered into secret negotiations with Allies. At two o'clock in the morning on 31 March, Marmont marched his soldiers to an agreed place, was surrounded by Allied soldiers, and surrendered his forces and the city. Napoleon heard the news when he was at Juvisy, just fourteen miles from the city; he went immediately to Fontainebleau, where he arrived at 6:00 a.m. on the 31st, and abdicated the throne on April 4.

The Russian army, led by Alexander I, entered Paris by the Porte Saint-Denis on 31 March. Some Parisians welcomed them, waving white flags and wearing white as a sign of good will. Spies in Paris for King Louis XVIII, who was waiting in exile in England, misunderstood the symbolism of the white flags and reported to him that the Parisians were waving the symbolic color of the Bourbon dynasty, and were eagerly awaiting his return. Talleyrand welcomed the Czar at his own residence; he had a list of ministers for a provisional government already prepared. Orchestrated by Talleyrand, on 1 April, the President of the General Council of the Seine appealed for Louis XVIII to return; the French Senate echoed the appeal on 6 April. The King returned to the city on 3 May, where he was welcomed with joy by royalists but indifference by most Parisians, who simply wanted peace.

=== The return of the monarchy and the Hundred Days ===
Paris was occupied by Prussian, Russian, Austrian and British soldiers, who camped in the Bois de Boulogne and the open land along the Champs Élysées, and remained for several months, while the King restored the royal government and replaced Bonapartists with his own ministers, many of whom returned from exile with him. The discontent of the Parisians grew as the new government, following the guidance of the new religious authorities named by the King, required all shops and markets to close and banned any sort of entertainment or leisure activities on Sundays. The King was particularly unpopular with the former soldiers and with workers, who suffered from high unemployment. Taxes were raised while British imports were allowed to enter without duty, with the result that the Parisian textile industry very quickly was largely shut down.

Early in March 1815 Parisians were astonished by the news that Napoleon had left his exile on Elba and was back in France, on the way to Paris. Louis XVIII fled the city on 19 March, and 20 March Napoleon was back in the Tuileries Palace. Enthusiasm for the Emperor was high among the workers and former soldiers, but not among the general population, who feared another long war. During the Hundred Days between his return from Elba and his defeat at Waterloo, Napoleon spent three months in Paris, busily reconstructing his regime. He organized grand military reviews and parades, restored the tricolor flag. Wishing to show himself as a constitutional monarch rather than a dictator, he abolished censorship, but personally reviewed the budgets of the Paris theaters. He resumed work on several of his unfinished projects, including the Elephant fountain at the Bastille, a new market at Saint-Germain, the foreign ministry building at the Quai d'Orsay and a new wing of the Louvre. The theater conservatory, closed by the Bourbons, was re-opened with the actor François-Joseph Talma on the faculty, and Denon was restored to his position as director of the Louvre.

By April 1815, however, enthusiasm for the Emperor diminished, as war appeared inevitable. Conscription was extended to married men, and only the soldiers cheered the Emperior when he passed. A huge ceremony was held on June 1 on the Champs de Mars, celebrating the referendum approving the Acte Additionnel, a new law establishing him as a constitutional monarch. Napoleon wore a purple robe and addressed a crowd of 15,000 seated guests and a crowd of hundred thousand more persons standing behind them. The ceremony featured a hundred cannon salute, a religious procession, solemn oaths, songs, and a military parade; it was the last great Napoleonic event held in the city, before the Emperor departed for the front on June 12 and his eventual defeat at Waterloo on June 18.

== Chronology ==
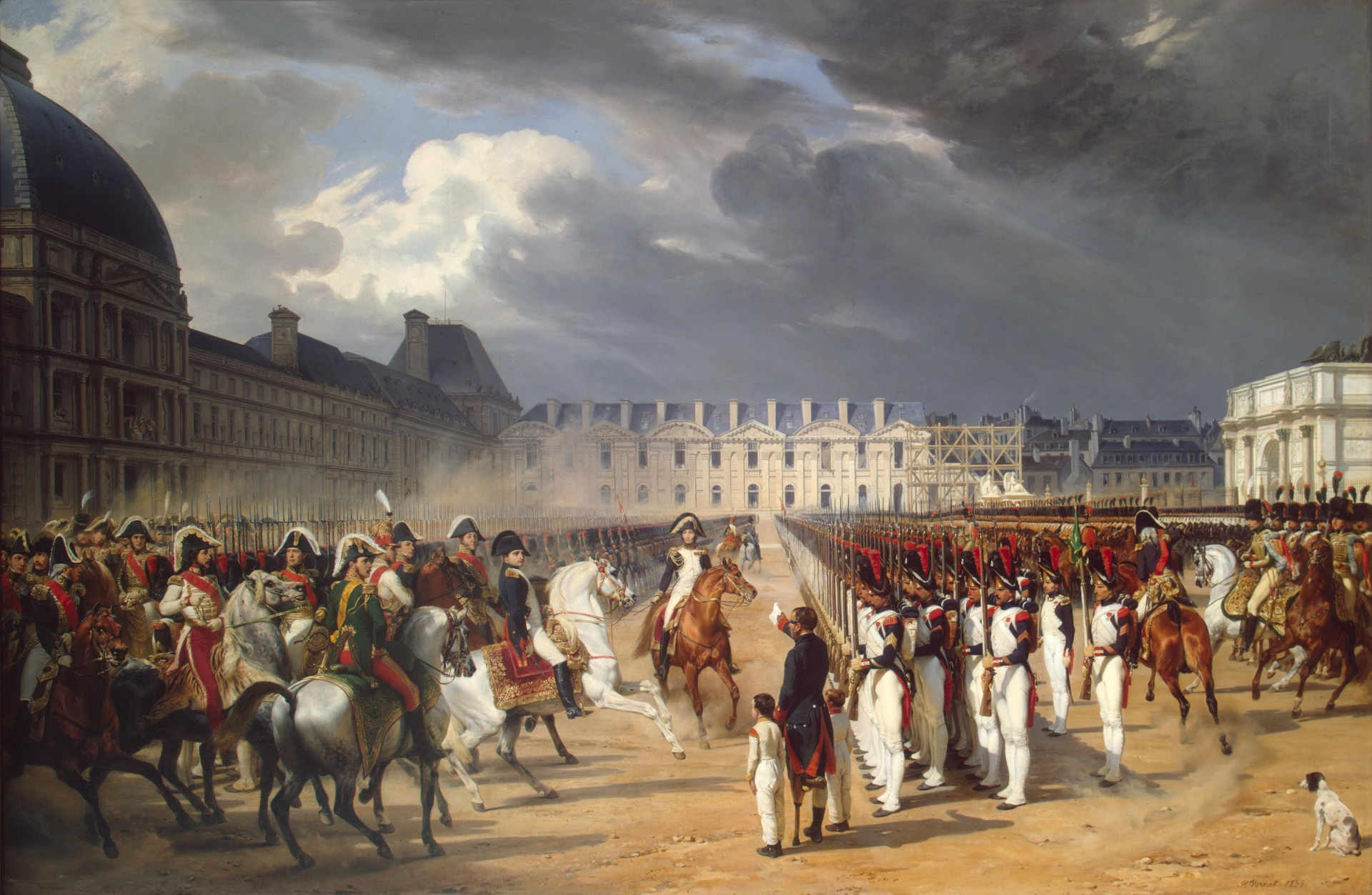
Napoleon at the Tuileries by Horace Vernet, 1838. The painting shows the northern gallery of the Louvre under construction.

- 1800
  - 13 February – Banque de France created.
  - 17 February – Napoleon reorganizes city into twelve arrondissements, each with a mayor with little power, under two Prefects, one for the police and one for administration of the city, both appointed by him.
  - 19 February – Napoleon makes the Tuileries Palace his residence.

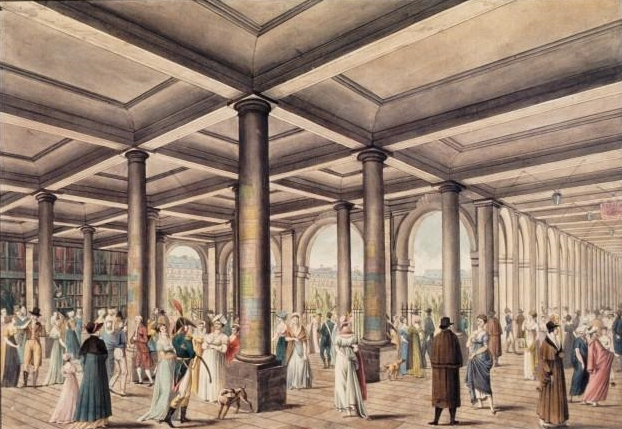
Galeries of the Palais-Royal in 1800

- 1801
  - Population: 548,000
  - 12 March – Napoleon orders the creation of three new cemeteries outside the city; Montmartre to the north; Père-Lachaise to the east, and Montparnasse to the south
  - 15 March – Napoleon orders the building of three new bridges: Pont d'Austerlitz, Pont Saint-Louis and Pont des Arts.
- 1802
  - 19 March – Napoleon orders the construction of a canal from the Ourcq river to bring fresh drinking water to Paris.
  - Napoleon establishes a committee of public health, to improve city sanitation.
- 1803

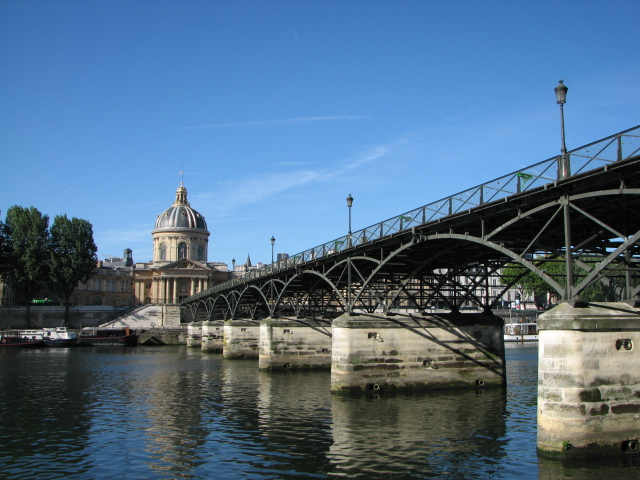
The Pont des Arts, built by Napoleon I in 1802. was the first iron bridge in Paris. The Institut de France is in the background.

  - 9 August – Robert Fulton demonstrates the first steamboat on the Seine. He also organizes exhibitions of panoramic paintings where the Passage des Panoramas is now located.
  - 24 September – Pont des Arts, the first iron bridge in Paris, opens to public. Pedestrians pay five centimes for a crossing.
- 1804
  - 2 December – Napoleon crowns himself Emperor of the French at the cathedral of Notre-Dame de Paris.
  - Père Lachaise Cemetery consecrated.
  - First awards of the Legion of Honor at the Invalides. The former hôtel de Salm becomes the Palais de la Légion d'honneur.
  - The restaurant Au Rocher de Cancale opens.
- 1805
  - 4 February – Napoleon decrees a new system of house numbers, beginning at the Seine, with even numbers on the right side of street and odd numbers on the left.
- 1806
  - 2 May – Decree ordering the building of fourteen new fountains, including the Fontaine du Palmier on the Place du Châtelet, to provide drinking water.
  - 7 July – First stone laid for the Arc de Triomphe du Carrousel, on Place du Carrousel, between the Tuileries Palace and the Louvre.
  - 8 August – First stone laid for the Arc de Triomphe at Étoile. Inaugurated on 29 July 1836, during the reign of Louis Philippe.
  - 24 November – Opening of the Pont d'Austerlitz.
  - 2 December – Decree ordering the creation a "Temple of Glory" dedicated to the soldiers of Napoleon's armies on the site of the unfinished church of the Madeleine.
- 1807
  - Population: 580,000
  - 13 January – Pont d'Iéna inaugurated. and Théâtre des Variétés opens.
  - 13 June – Decree to build rue Soufflot on the left bank, on the axis of the Panthéon.
  - 29 July – Decree reducing the number of theaters in Paris to eight; the Opéra, Opéra-Comique, Théâtre-Français, Théâtre de l'Impératrice (Odéon); Vaudeville, Variétés, Ambigu, Gaîté. The Opéra Italien, Cirque Olympique and Théâtre de Porte-Saint-Martin were added later.
- 1808
  - 2 December – Completion of the Ourcq Canal, bringing fresh drinking water 107 kilometers to Paris.
  - 2 December – First stone placed of the elephant fountain on Place de la Bastille. Only a wood and plaster full-size version was completed.
- 1809
  - 16 August – Opening of the flower market on quai Desaix (now quai de Corse).
- 1810
  - 5 February – For censorship purpose, number of printing houses in Paris limited to fifty.
  - 2 April – Religious ceremony of the marriage of Napoléon to his second wife, Marie-Louise of Austria, in the Salon carré of the Louvre.
  - 4 April – first stone laid for the Palace of the Ministry of Foreign Affairs on the quai d'Orsay. It was completed in 1838.
  - 15 August – Completion of the Place Vendôme column, made of 1200 captured Russian and Austrian cannons
  - Catacombs renovated.
- 1811
  - Population: 624,000
  - 20 March – Birth of Napoléon François Charles Joseph Bonaparte, King of Rome, son of Napoléon I and empress Marie-Louise, at the Tuileries.
  - 18 September – first battalion of Paris firemen organized.
- 1812
  - The Sûreté, the investigative bureau of the Paris police, founded by Eugène François Vidocq.
  - 1 March – Water from Paris fountains is made free of charge.
- 1814
  - 30 March – The Battle of Paris. The city is defended by Marmont and Mortier. It is surrendered at 2 a.m. on 31 March.
  - 31 March – Czar Alexander I of Russia and King William I of Prussia enter Paris, at the head of their armies.
  - 6 April – Abdication of Napoleon. The French Senate appeals to King Louis XVIII to take the crown.
  - 3 May – Louis XVIII enters Paris, occupied by the allied armies.
- 1815
  - 19 March – Louis XVIII leaves Paris at midnight, and Napoleon returns on the 20th, the beginning of the Hundred Days.
  - After the battle of Waterloo, Paris is again occupied, this time by the Seventh Coalition.
