= 1835 in architecture =

The year 1835 in architecture involved some significant architectural events and new buildings.

== Events ==
- June 2–December 1 – Competition for the design of a new in London, to be in Gothic or Elizabethan style.
- June 6 – Augustus Pugin is received into the Roman Catholic Church in a chapel in Salisbury, England, restored by himself. At about this time he also writes his first controversial publication, the pamphlet Letter to A. W. Hakewill, architect, in answer to his reflections on the style for rebuilding the Houses of Parliament.
- Late – The Sharpe, Paley and Austin architectural practice is established by Edmund Sharpe in Lancaster, England.
- Robert Mills starts to construct the Old Patent Office Building, Washington, D.C., United States.
- Eugène Viollet-le-Duc is commissioned by Prosper Mérimée to restore Vézelay Abbey, the first of many restorations by him.

== Buildings and structures ==
=== Buildings completed ===
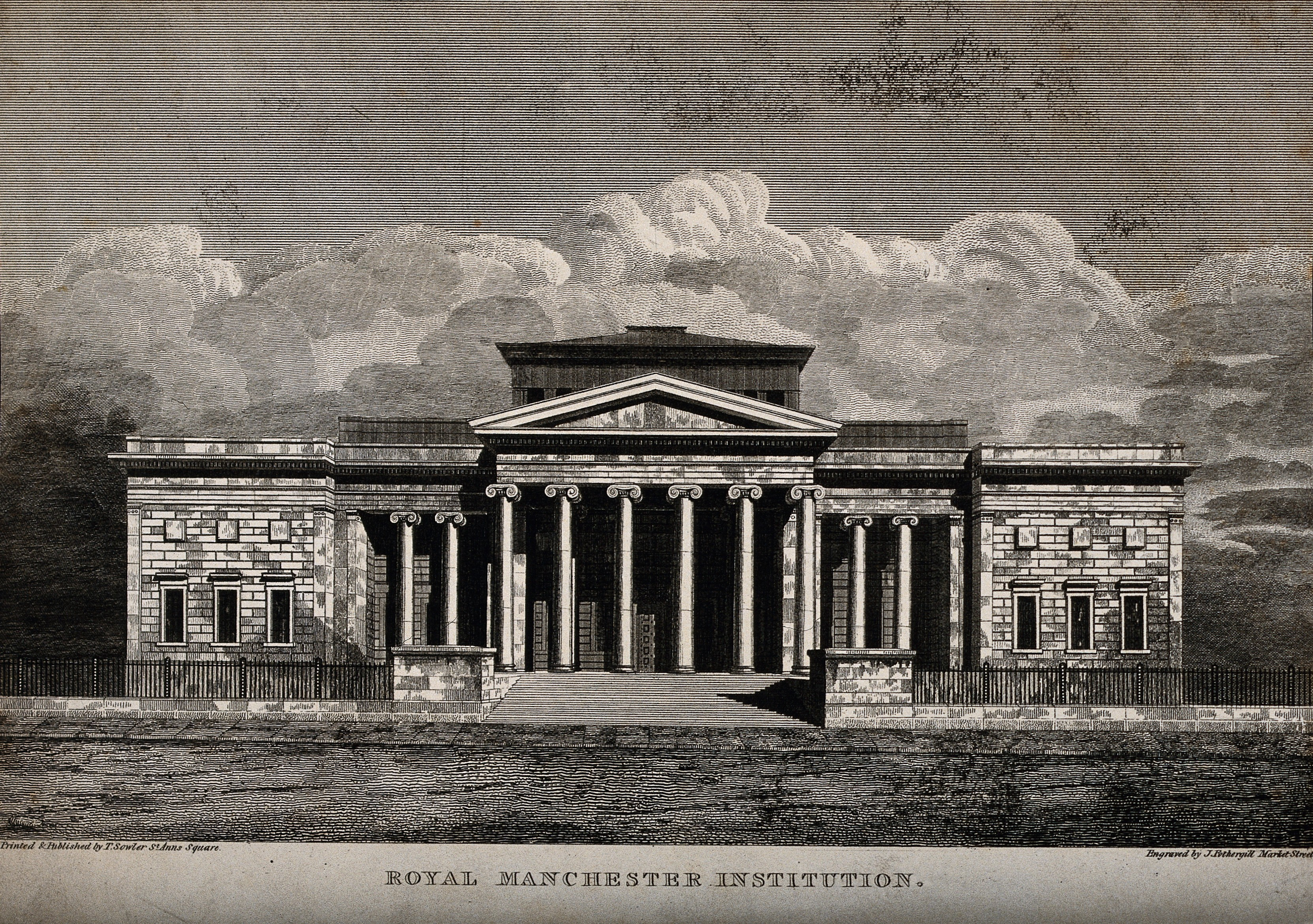
Royal Manchester Institution

- Royal Manchester Institution, England, by Charles Barry (core of Manchester Art Gallery).
- Redesign of Buckingham Palace, London, by John Nash.
- St Mary's Church, Westley, Suffolk, England, designed by William Ranger, an early example of concrete construction, using poured mass concrete and precast blocks combined with a functional hammerbeam roof of cast iron.
- New Hurley Reformed Church, New York.
- Pawiak, prison in Warsaw, Poland (destroyed in 1944).
- Warehouse at Ellesmere Port, England, by Thomas Telford (destroyed by fire in 1970).
- St Marie's Grange, Salisbury, England, a house by Augustus Pugin for himself (built January–September).

== Awards ==
- Grand Prix de Rome, architecture: Charles Victor Famin.

== Births ==
- April 2 – William Eden Nesfield, English domestic revival architect (died 1888)
- May 9 – Hans Jørgen Holm, Danish architect (died 1916)
- July 11 – John Macvicar Anderson, Scottish-born architect (died 1915)
- August 13 – Paul Due, Norwegian architect known for his railway stations (died 1919)

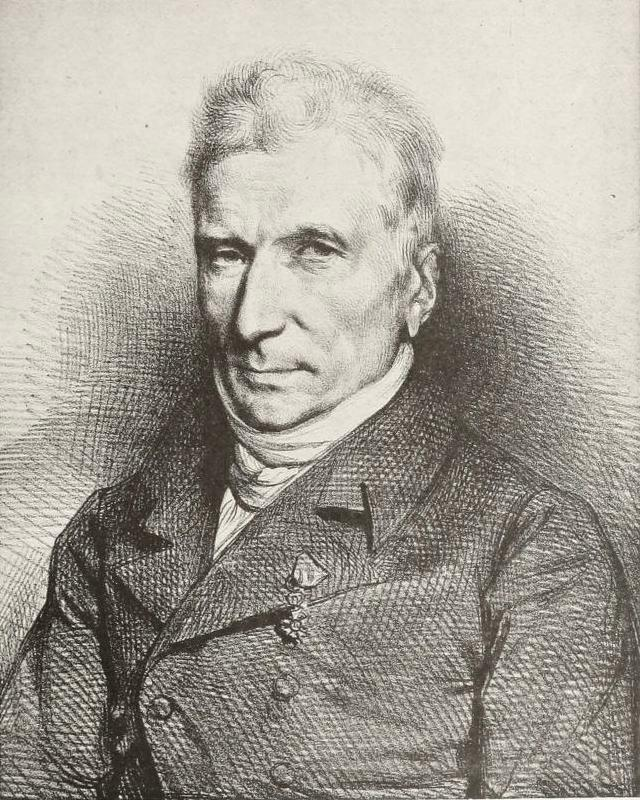
Guy de Gisors

- December 21 – Thomas Graham Jackson, English architect active in Oxford (died 1924)
- date unknown – Hans Price, English architect active in Weston-super-Mare (died 1912)

== Deaths ==
- May 13 – John Nash, British architect responsible for much of the layout of Regency London (born 1752)
- May 16 – Guy de Gisors, French architect (born 1762)
