= Fontaine du Fellah =

Fountain in Paris, France

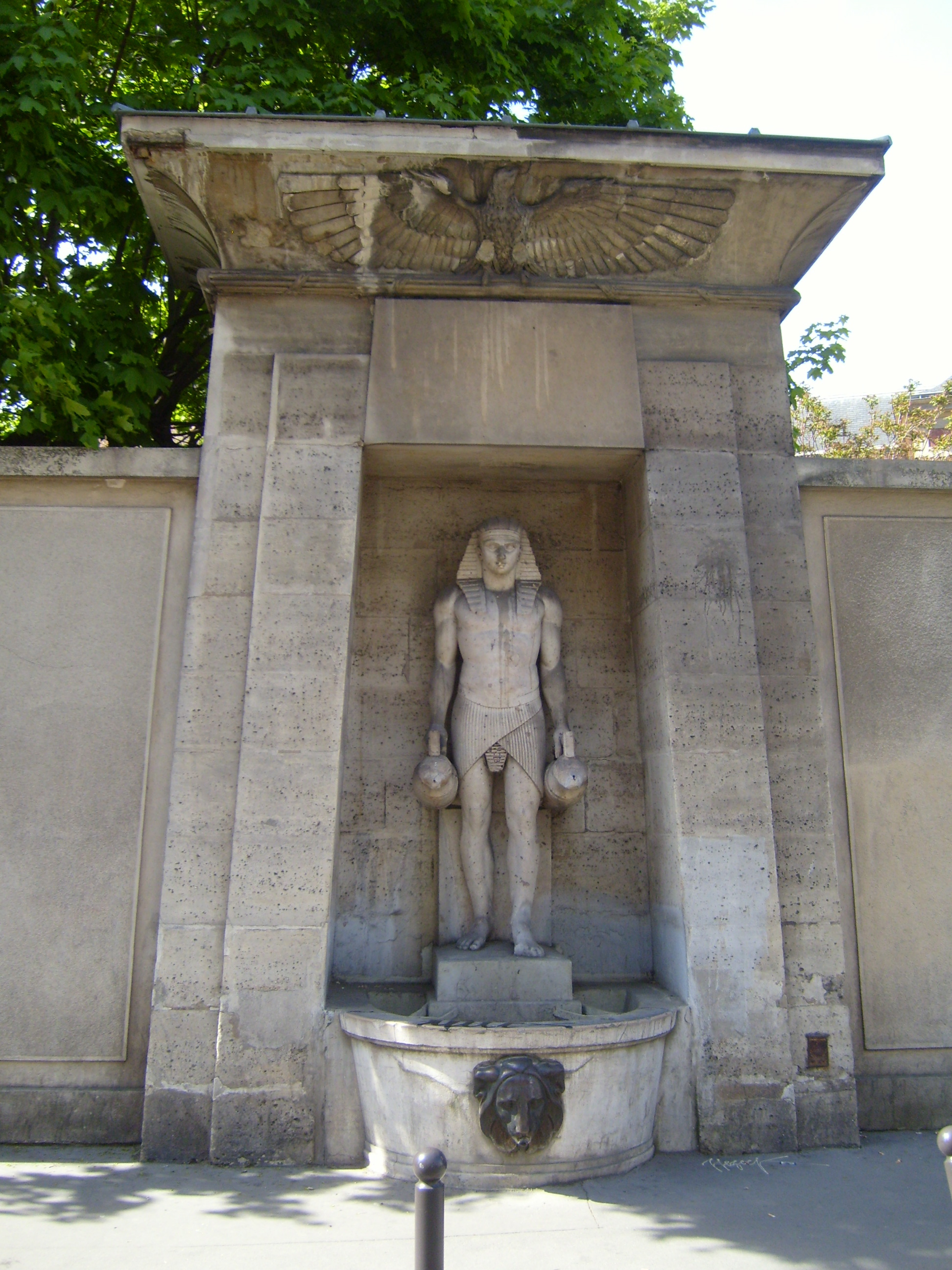
- Interactive map of the Fontaine du Fellah area
- Former names: Egyptian Fountain

General information
- Type: Fountain
- Architectural style: Egyptian Revival
- Location: 52 rue de Sèvres, Paris, France
- Coordinates: 48°50′55.32″N 02°19′16.32″E
- Completed: 1806

Technical details
- Material: Stone

Design and construction
- Architect: François-Jean Bralle
- Other designers: Pierre-Nicolas Beauvallet (sculptor)
- Designations: Monument historique (1977)

The Fontaine du Fellah, also known as the Egyptian Fountain, located at 52 rue de Sèvres in the 7th arrondissement of Paris, next to the entrance of the Vaneau metro station, was built in 1806 during the rule of Napoleon Bonaparte, in the neo-Egyptian style inspired by Napoleon's Egyptian campaign. It is the work of architect François-Jean Bralle and sculptor Pierre-Nicolas Beauvallet. It has been listed since 1977 as a monument historique by the French Ministry of Culture.

== History ==
The Fontaine du Fellah was one of fifteen fountains constructed by Napoleon to provide, from his Canal de l'Ourcq project, fresh drinking water to the population of Paris, and to commemorate his military campaigns. The fountain was constructed against the wall of what was then the hospital for incurable patients. It was the work of architect François-Jean Bralle, the chief engineer of the water supply for the city of Paris, who was also responsible for reconstructing the Medici Fountain in the Luxembourg Garden and several other fountains. The sculptural decoration was by Pierre-Nicolas Beauvallet, who also worked on the decoration of the column in Place Vendôme, and made busts of many revolutionary figures. The present statue is a copy made of Beauvalet's original by Jean-François Gechter.

The fountain was in working order until 2005, when it was shut down because of leakage into the nearby Vaneau Metro Station.

== Description ==
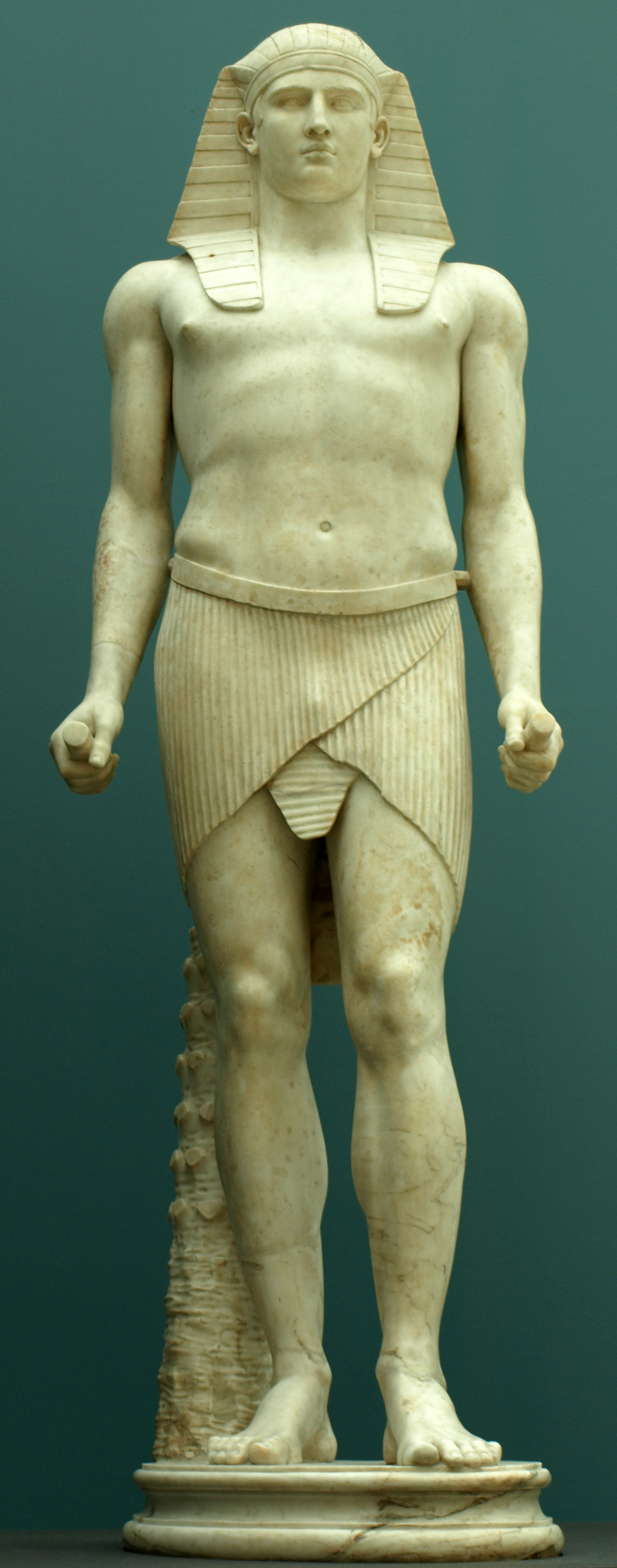
This statue of the Roman Antinoüs dressed as Osiris, found in Hadrian's villa in 1739, apparently was the model for the fountain

The title refers to an Egyptian fellah, or peasant, but the statue appears to be a copy of a Roman statue of Antinous, a favorite of the Emperor Hadrian, which was discovered in the excavation of Hadrian's villa in Tivoli in 1739. The original of the statue is found in the Vatican Museum in Rome.

The figure holds two amphorae, one in each hand. Water poured from the amphorae into the semicircular basin below, then through a bronze masqueron in the form of a lion's head. The top of the fountain is decorated with an eagle, signifying Napoleon's imperial rule.
