= Alphonse de Gisors =

French architect

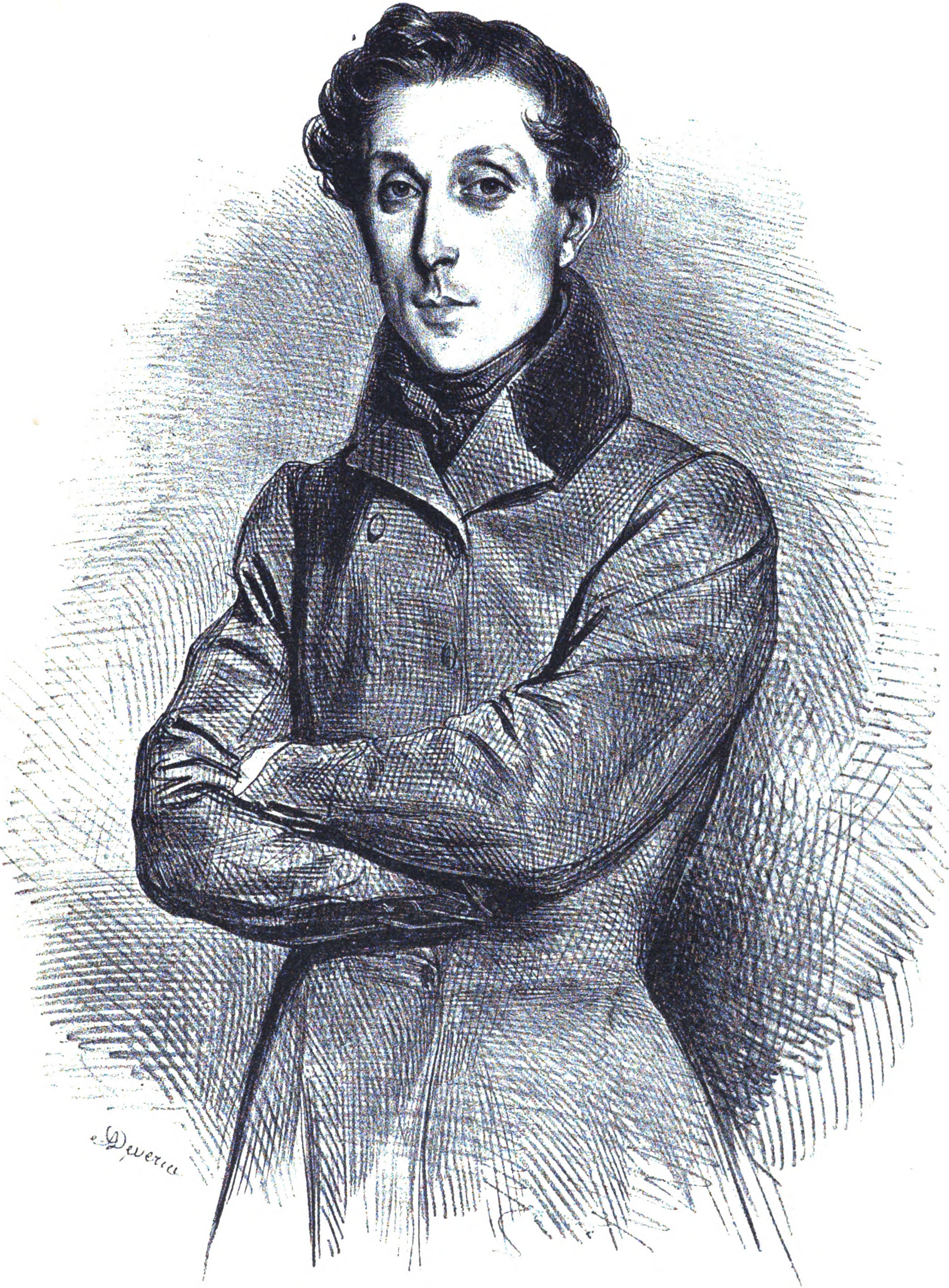
Alphonse de Gisors

Alphonse-Henri Guy de Gisors (3 September 1796 – 18 August 1866) was a 19th-century French architect, a member of the Gisors family of architects and prominent government administrators responsible for the construction and preservation of many public buildings in Paris.

== Early training and career ==
He was born in Paris, where he studied at the Ecole des Beaux-Arts with Charles Percier and his uncle Guy de Gisors, who helped him obtain a position with the Bâtiments Civils in 1822. He won second place in the Prix de Rome in 1823 and was promoted to Architecte in 1824.

Early in his career he used the classical style of Percier, designing fire stations, theatres, town halls, and other public buildings in Paris and the provinces. Around 1828 he designed the Hôtel de la Préfecture and the Hôtel de Ville in Ajaccio, Corsica.

== Later career ==
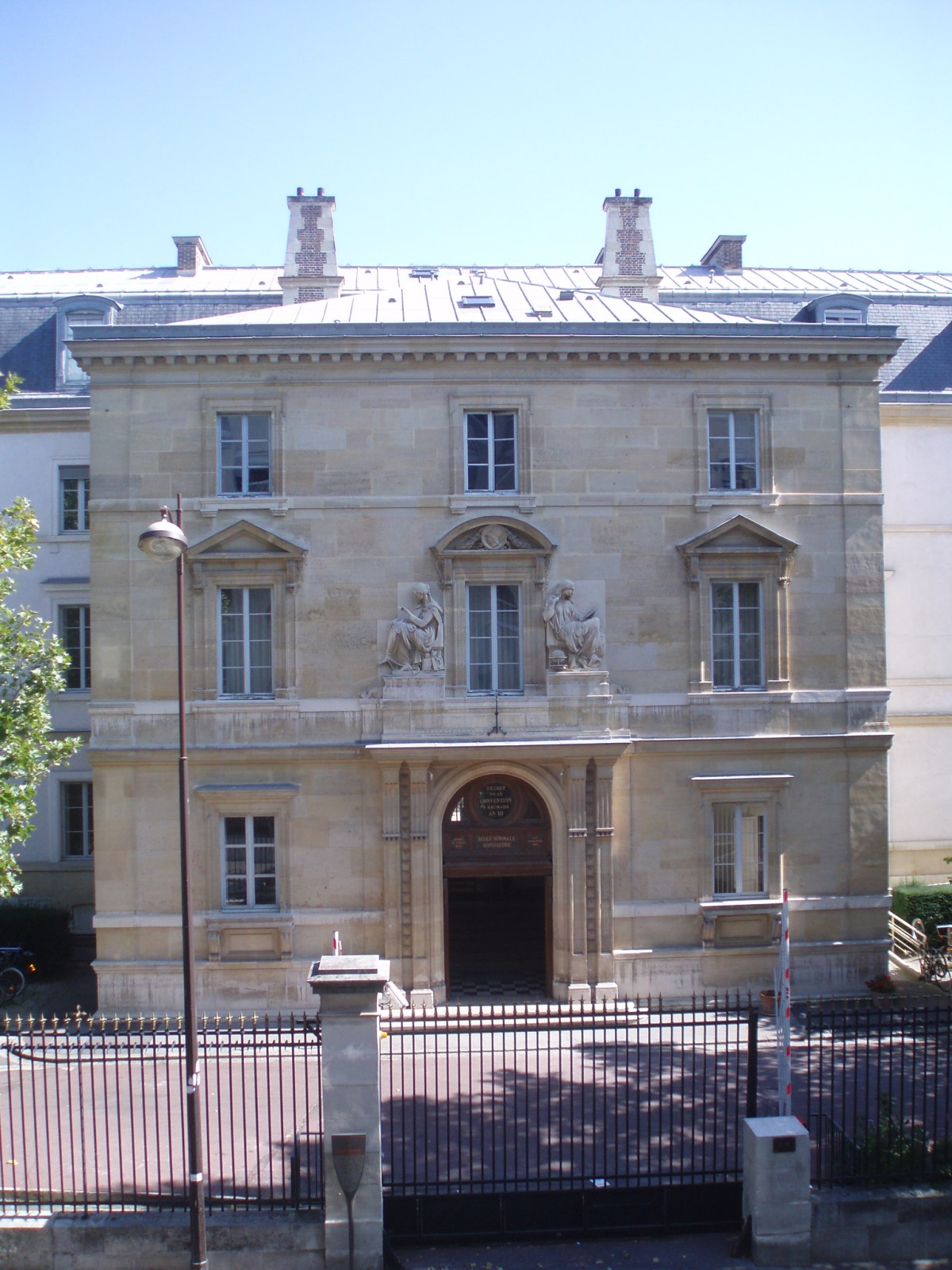
Ecole Normale Supérieure

His major work was an extension of Salomon de Brosse's Palais du Luxembourg between 1836 and 1841, when he added a garden-side wing parallel to the original corps de logis and a wood-panelled Chamber of Sessions on the first floor in an area that otherwise would have been part of a large interior courtyard. The new wing included a library (bibliothèque) with a cycle of paintings (1845–1847) by Eugène Delacroix. The garden facade of his addition is so similar to the original that at first glance it is difficult to distinguish the new from the old.

Southwest of the Petit Luxembourg, in the Luxembourg Garden, he constructed an orangery, which was later remodeled and enlarged to become in 1886 the new home of the Musée du Luxembourg, previously in the east wing of the Luxembourg Palace. In 1840 he rebuilt the street facade of the chapel of the former Convent of the Daughters of Calvary (founded in 1622 by Marie de Médicis), one of the remnants incorporated into the west wing of the Petit Luxembourg.

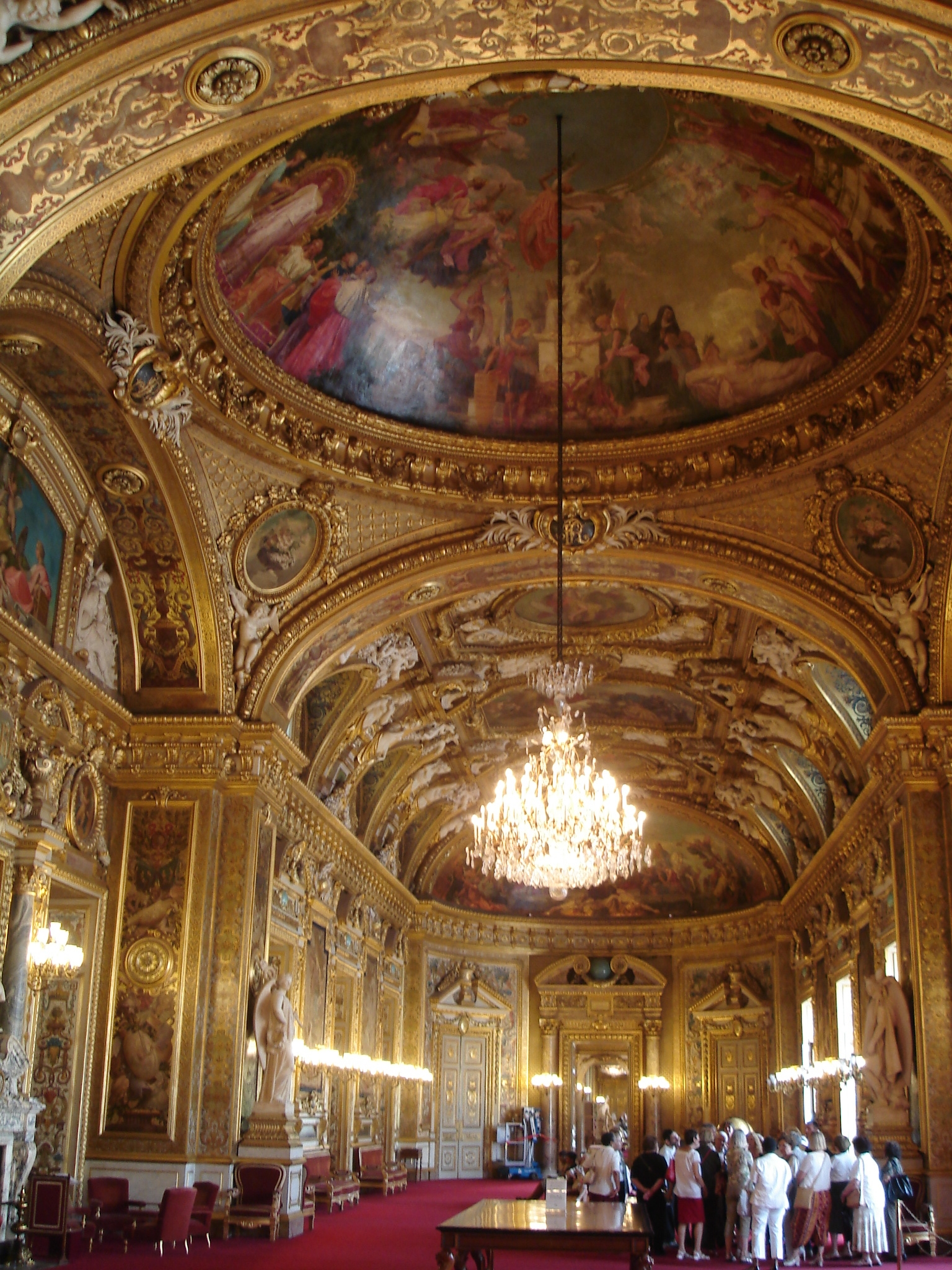
Salle des Conférences

From 1841 to 1847 he worked on the Ecole Normale Supérieure.

In the 1850s he joined a first-floor suite of rooms in the Luxembourg Palace on the courtyard side of the original corps de logis, creating the highly ornate Salle des Conférences. Inspired by the Galerie d'Apollon of the Louvre, it influenced the nature of subsequent official interiors of the Second Empire, including those of the Palais Garnier.

In 1861 he shifted the Medici Fountain in the Luxembourg Gardens slightly closer to the palace to make way for the rue de Médicis. He also restored the arms of France and of the Medici on the fountain and created a 50-metre-long rectangle of water bounded by an alley of plane trees.

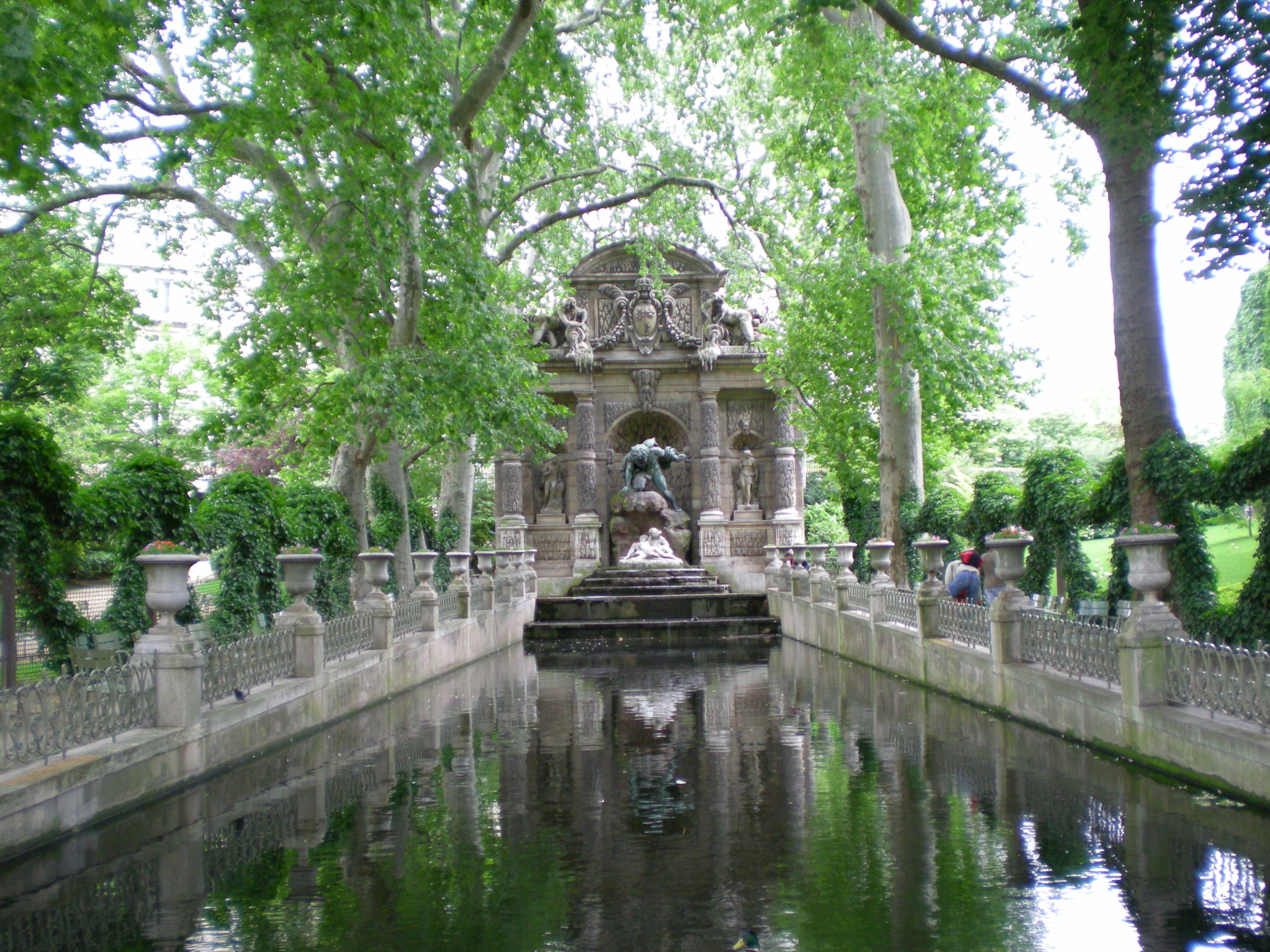
The Medici Fountain with Gisor's reflecting pool

In 1864 the extension of the rue de Rennes prompted Gisors to move the Fontaine du Regard (built in 1807 at the intersection of the rue de Vaugirard and the rue du Regard) and to attach it to the back of the Medici Fountain.
