= Fontaine du Palmier =

Monumental fountain in Paris, France

Fountain of the Palm
- Fontaine du Palmier
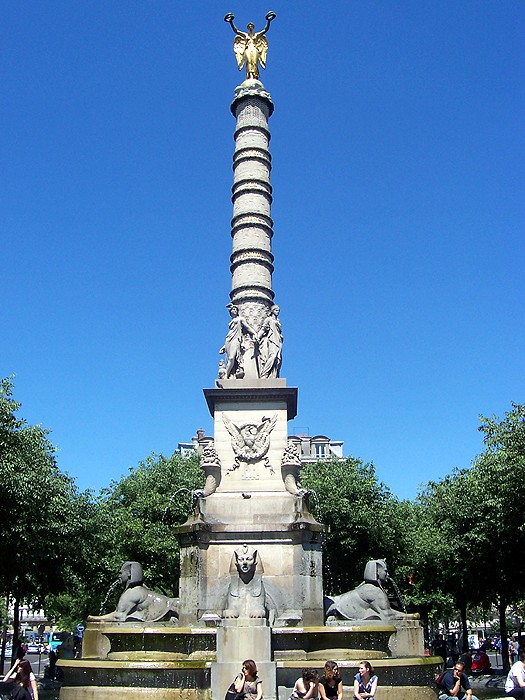
- Interactive map of Fountain of the Palm
- Coordinates: 48°51′26.99″N 2°20′50.17″E
- Designer: François-Jean Bralle
- Type: fountain, victory column
- Width: 20 feet (6.1 m)
- Height: 59 feet (18 m)
- Beginning date: 1806
- Opening date: 1808
- Monument Historique (1925) PA00085806

The Fontaine du Palmier (1806-1808) or Fontaine de la Victoire is a monumental fountain located in the Place du Châtelet, between the Théâtre du Châtelet and the Théâtre de la Ville, in the First Arrondissement of Paris. It was designed to provide fresh drinking water to the population of the neighborhood and to commemorate the victories of Napoleon Bonaparte. It is the largest fountain built during Napoleon's reign still in existence. The closest métro station is Châtelet

== Design ==
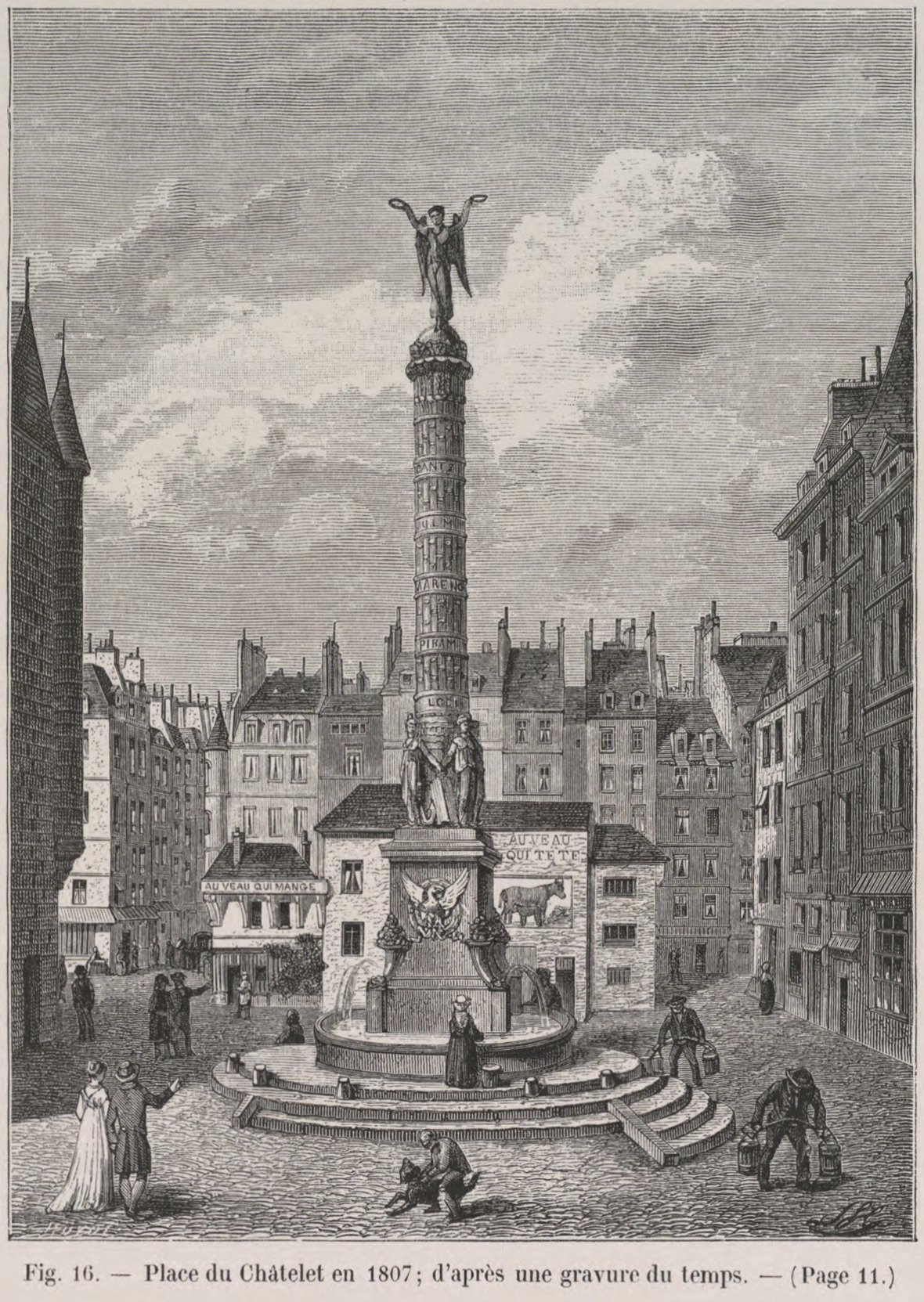
The fountain in 1807 before the final demolition of the Grand Châtelet and before the addition of the base in 1858.

The Fountain du Palmier was one of a series of fifteen fountains commissioned by Napoleon in 1806 to his minister of the Interior, Emmanuel Cretet. It was designed by the engineer François-Jean Bralle, who was in charge of the Paris fountains and water supply during the First Empire. It was finished in 1808.

The column, modeled after a Roman triumphal column, takes its name from the sculpted palm leaves at the top, commemorating Napoleon's Egyptian Campaign. The bands of bronze on the column pay tribute to Napoleon's victories at the siege of Danzig (1807), the Battle of Ulm (1805), the Battle of Marengo (1800), the Battle of the Pyramids (1798), and the Battle of Lodi (1796).

At the top of the column is a statue of Victory made of gilded bronze, carrying the laurels of victory. People sometimes mistake the statue of the woman representing victory for a bird. The statue is the work of the sculptor Louis-Simon Boizot. The present statue is a copy; the original is in the courtyard of the Carnavalet Museum of the history of Paris.

Around the base of the column are four statues representing Vigilance, Justice, Strength and Prudence, also made by Boizot. The lower basin of the fountain, designed by architect Gabriel Davioud, was added to the fountain in 1858 during the reign of Emperor Louis Napoleon when the Place du Châtelet was expanded and the fountain moved to its center during the renovations of Baron Haussmann. At that time the base was also decorated with statues of Egyptian sphinxes spouting streams of water, sculpted by Henri Alfred Jacquemart.

== Gallery ==
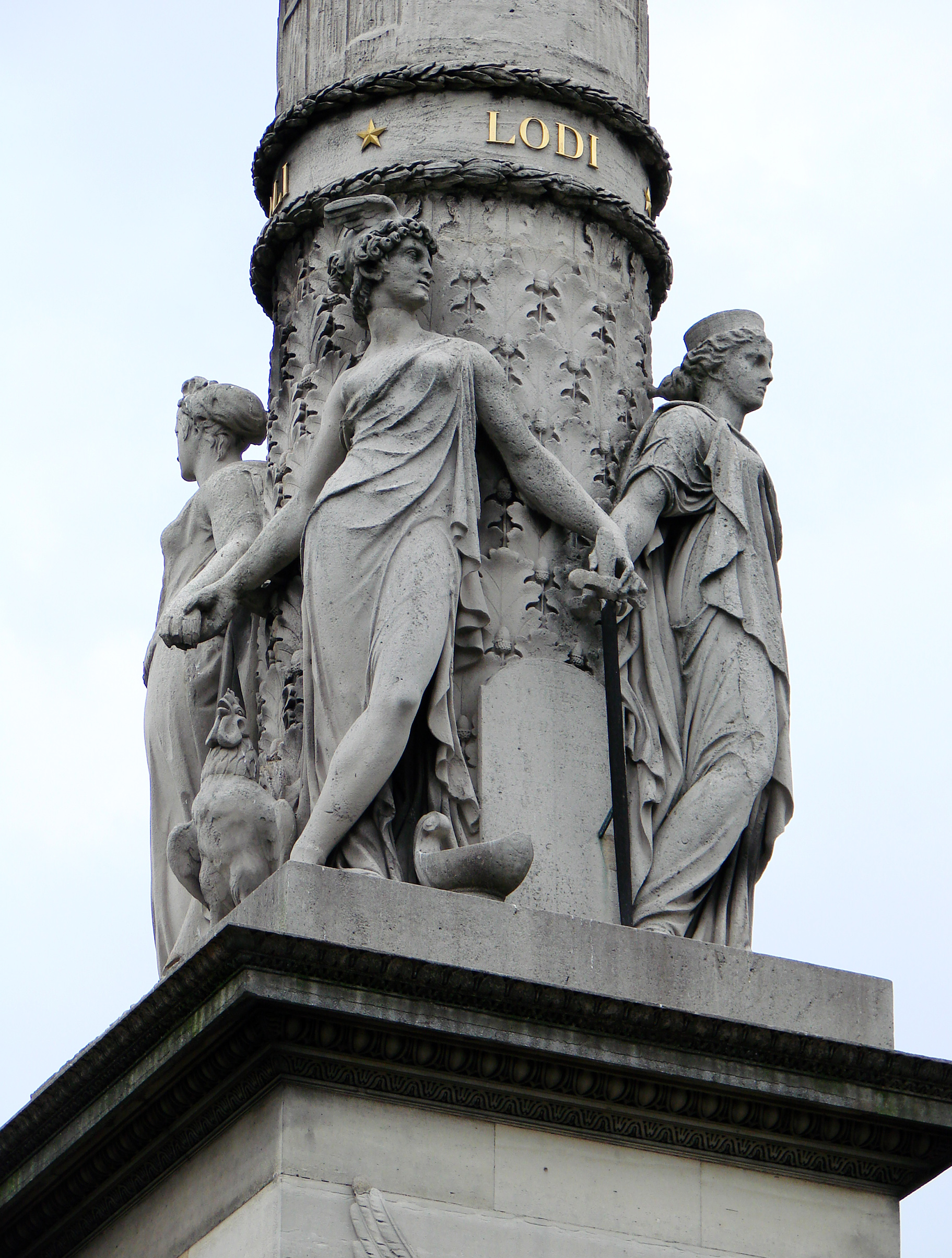
Figures of Vigilance, Justice, Strength and Prudence

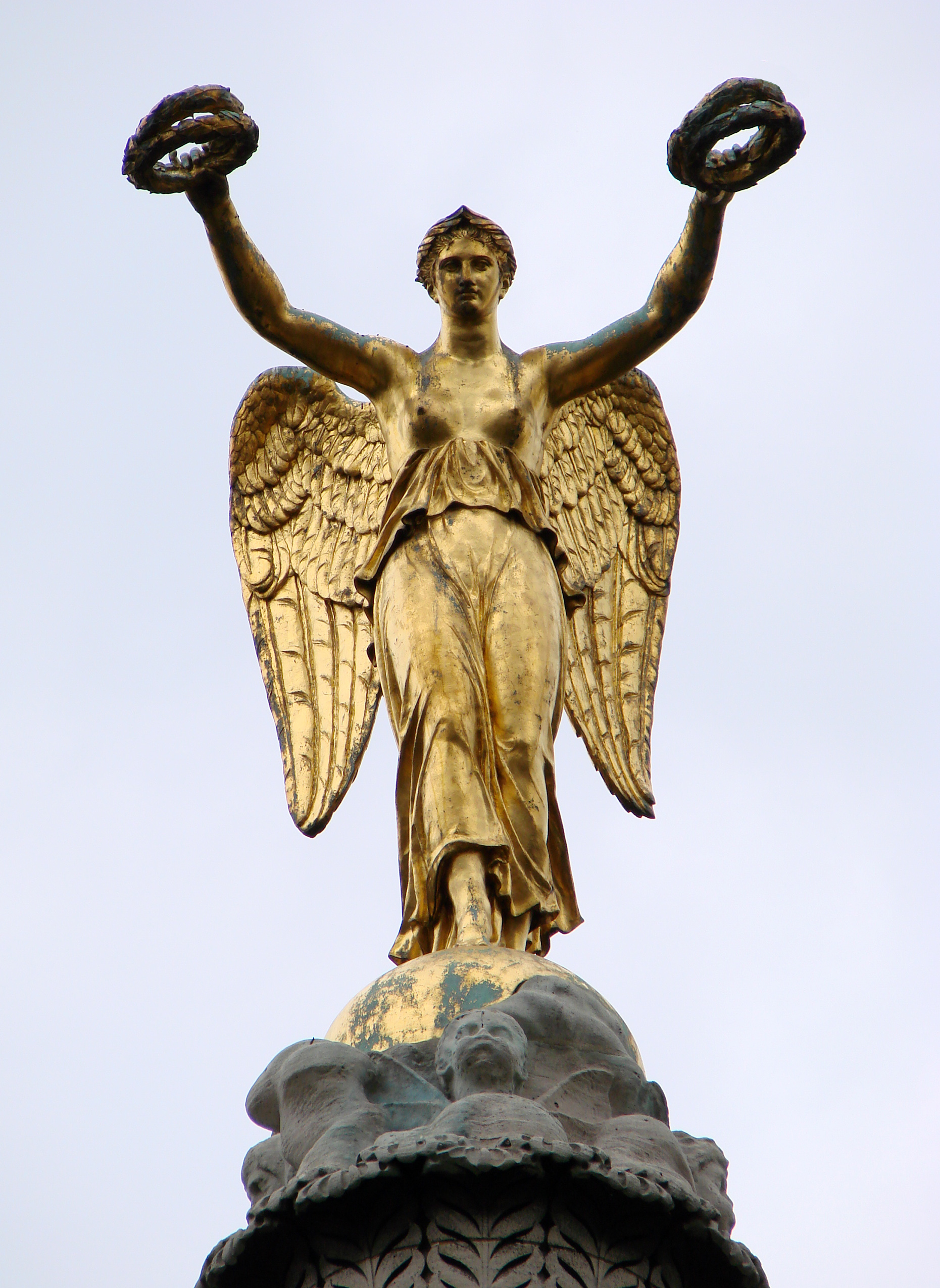
Statue of Victory atop the Fountain

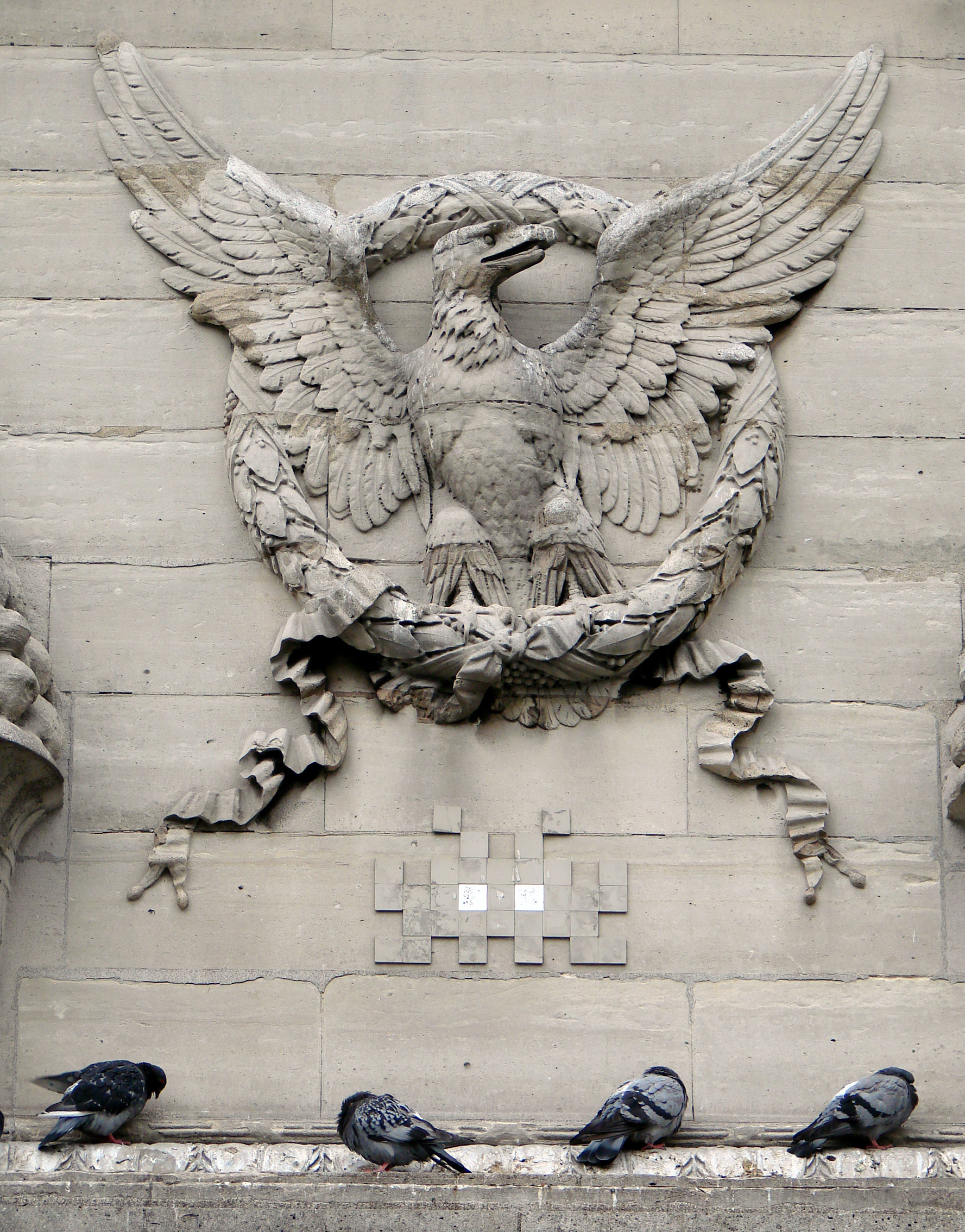
Imperial eagle on the Fontaine du Palmier

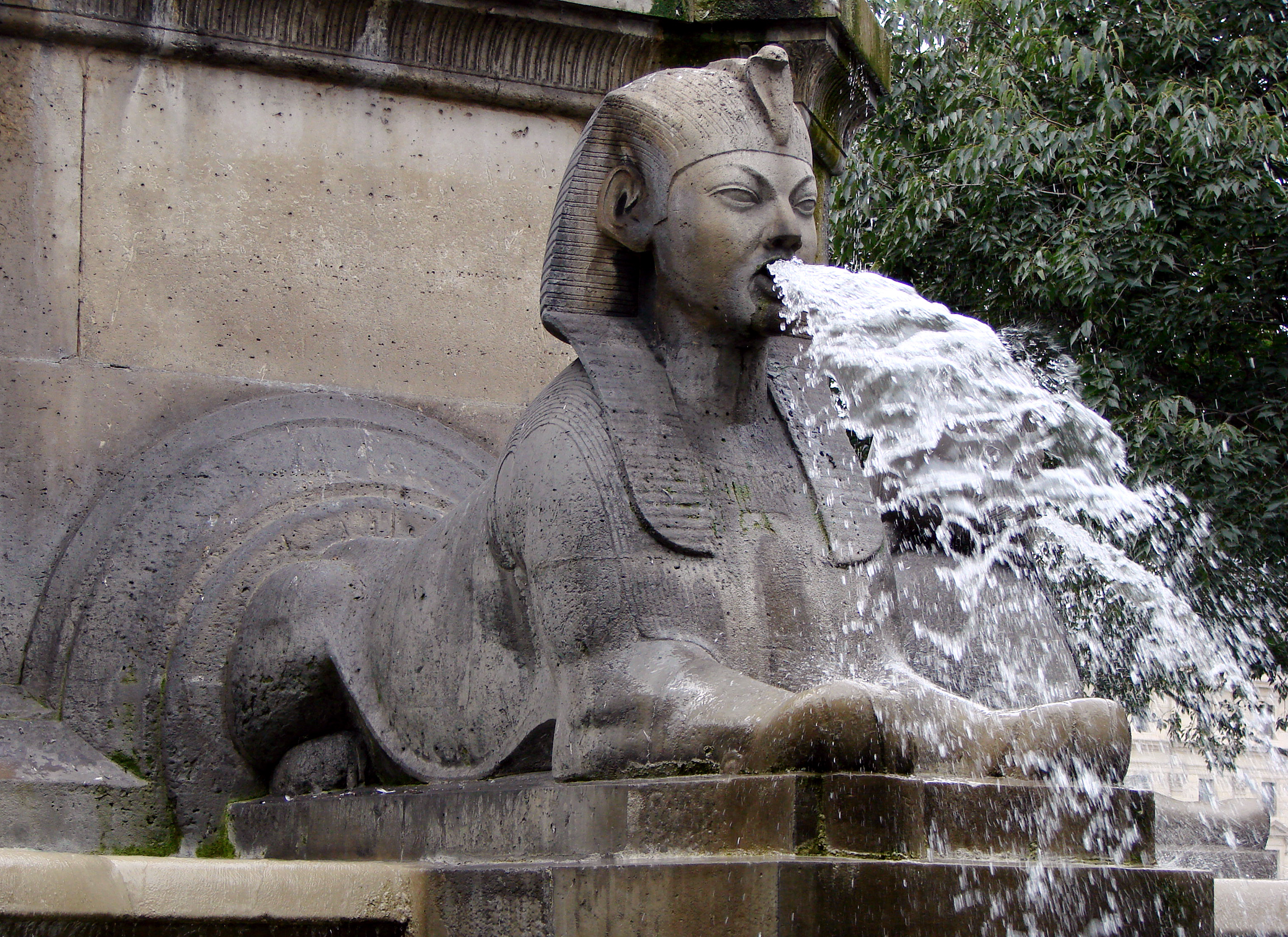
Sphinx at base of the Fontaine du Palmier

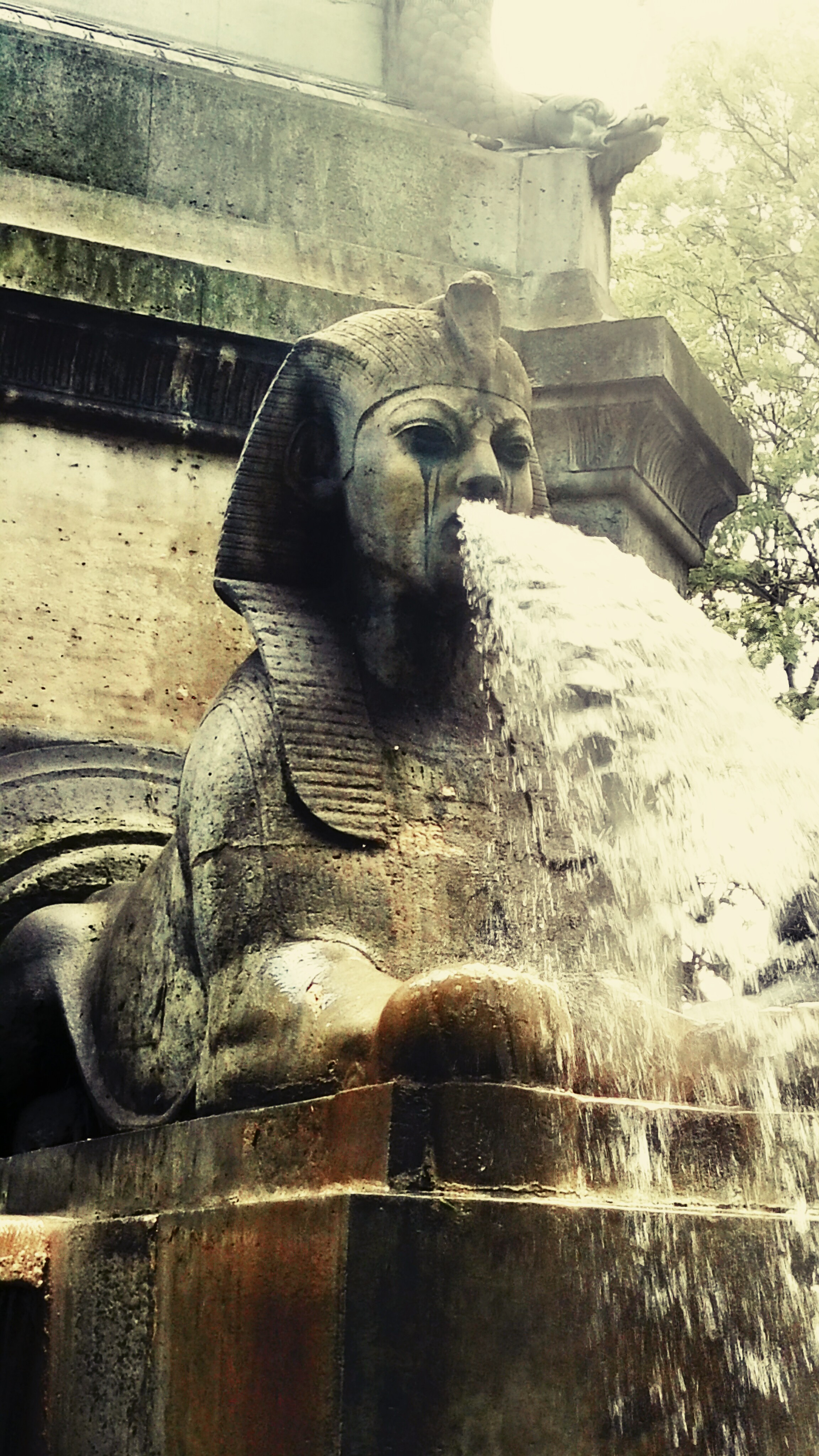
Other sphinx at the base of the Fountain

== Bibliography ==
- Marie-Hélène Levadé et Hugues Marcouyeau, Les fontaines de Paris : l'eau pour le plaisir - Paris, 2008.
- *Paris et ses fontaines, de la Renaissance à nos jours, texts assembled by Dominque Massounie, Pauline-Prevost-Marcilhacy and Daniel Rabreau, Délegation a l'action artistique de la Ville de Paris. from the Collection Paris et son Patrimoine, directed by Beatrice de Andia. Paris, 1995.

== See also ==
- Fountains in Paris
- Place du Châtelet
- Saint-Jacques Tower
