= Statue of Louis XVI =

Statue formerly installed in Louisville, Kentucky, U.S.

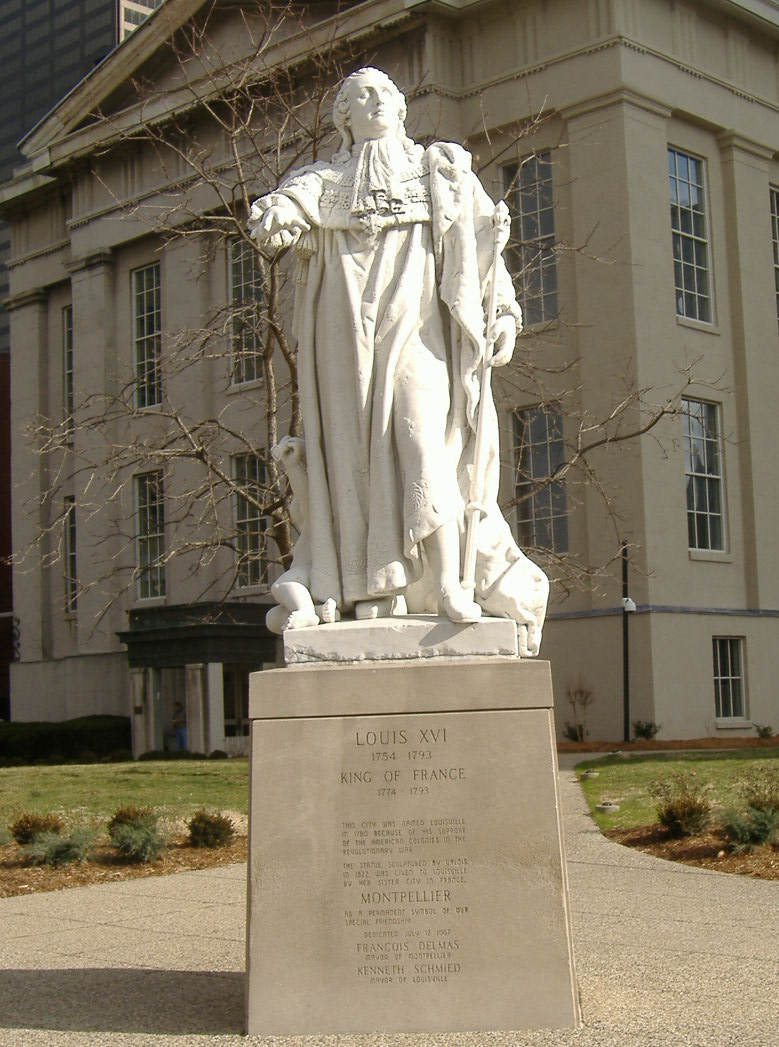
- The statue in 2008
- Artist: Achille Valois
- Subject: Louis XVI
- Location: Louisville, Kentucky, U.S.; 38°15′16″N 85°45′37″W

A statue of Louis XVI by Achille Valois arrived in Louisville, Kentucky, in December 1966 and was installed in July 1967. It is currently undergoing repairs from damage caused during protests of the killing of Breonna Taylor by the Louisville Metro Police Department.

== Description ==
Characteristics of the statue
Weight	Height	Material
6.5 tons	6′10″	Carrara marble with limestone base

== History ==
The statue's first home was the town square of Montpellier, France, in 1829. There, it was reviled and toppled over in less than year. It was then moved to a military dungeon and stayed there until it was discovered by an officer taking inventory in 1899. In 1966, Montpellier decided to give the statue to Louisville, Kentucky, since the city is named after Louis XVI. It was shipped on a U.S. Navy ship to Norfolk, Virginia, where it sat for a week in Naval Station Pier 2 in late 1966. The statue was then put on a train and made it to Louisville on Christmas Day 1966. The mayor of Louisville at the time, Kenneth Schmied, is quoted as saying, "It's a great Christmas present for our city."

Following vandalism during the May 2020 George Floyd protests, it was removed to a city storage facility that September. Restoration costs were estimated at $200,000, far beyond the appraised value of the marble statue.

== See also ==
- List of monuments and memorials removed during the George Floyd protests
