= Hôtel de Ville, Ajaccio =

Town hall in Ajaccio, France

Hôtel de Ville
- The main frontage of the Hôtel de Ville in October 2026

General information
- Type: City hall
- Architectural style: Neoclassical style
- Location: Ajaccio, France
- Coordinates: 41.9193°N 8.7391°E
- Completed: 1836

Design and construction
- Architect: Alphonse de Gisors

Monument historique
- Official name: Hôtel de ville
- Type: Inscrit
- Designated: 1990
- Reference no.: PA00099127

The Hôtel de Ville (French pronunciation: [otɛl də vil], City Hall) is a municipal building in Ajaccio, Corse-du-Sud, western Corsica, standing on Place du Maréchal Foch. It was designated a monument historique by the French government in 1990.

== History ==
In the 18th century, the main municipal building in Ajaccio was il Pubblico Palazzo (the town hall) in Strada del Vescovo (now Rue Pozzo Di Borgo) which dated back well before the French conquest of Corsica in 1768. In the early 19th century, civic leaders decided to lay out a new civic square to be known as Place des Palmiers (now Place du Maréchal Foch), with a statue created by the sculptor, Francesco Massimiliano Laboureur, depicting Napoleon dressed as a Roman consul at the west end. The statue was completed in 1806, but was not actually installed until half a century later.

In the 1820s, the mayor, Jean–Baptiste Spoturni, proposed that a new town hall be erected on the north side of the new square. The foundation stone was laid on 2 July 1826. It was designed by Alphonse de Gisors in the neoclassical style, built in brick with a cement render and was completed in 1836. The design involved a symmetrical main frontage of five bays facing onto Place des Palmiers. The central bay featured a porch, formed by Doric order columns supporting an entablature with triglyphs and a cornice. The other bays on the ground floor were fenestrated by casement windows flanked by brackets supporting cornices, while the bays on the first floor were fenestrated in a similar style put with triangular pediments. The bays on the first floor were separated by Doric order pilasters supporting a modillioned cornice, and there was a clock supported by scrolls above the central bay. Internally, the principal room was the Salon Napoléonien (Napoleon Room), which displayed various artifacts relating to the former emperor. The frescos on the ceiling were painted by the artist, Jérôme Maglioli.

The collection of Napoleonic memorabilia was augmented by a bequest of 31 portraits, some of which had belonged to Letizia Bonaparte, and which were left to the town by Cardinal Joseph Fesch when he died in May 1839. The collection was further augmented by a bequest of items left by Hippolyte Mortier, 3rd Duke of Treviso, when he died in 1892. The additions to the collection included a bust of Letizia Bonaparte, created by Raimondo Trentanove in 1818, as well as a portrait by Anne-Louis Girodet de Roussy-Trioson of the former emperor's father, Carlo Buonaparte. The building was extended to the east, by the creation of an extra three bay pavilion and a recessed connecting bay, between 1891 and 1892, on land reclaimed from the sea.

Following the liberation of the town on 9 September 1943, during the Second World War, the resistance leader, Maurice Choury, climbed on a roof of an ambulance outside the town hall and called for an insurrection against the fascist and Nazi occupiers. A memorial to the resistance, designed by Noel Bonardi and intended to commemorate the lives of local people who gave their lives in the Second World War, was unveiled at the east end of Place du Maréchal Foch in 1960.
