= Fontaine de Léda =

Fountain in Paris, France

Coordinates: 48.8480°N 2.3393°E

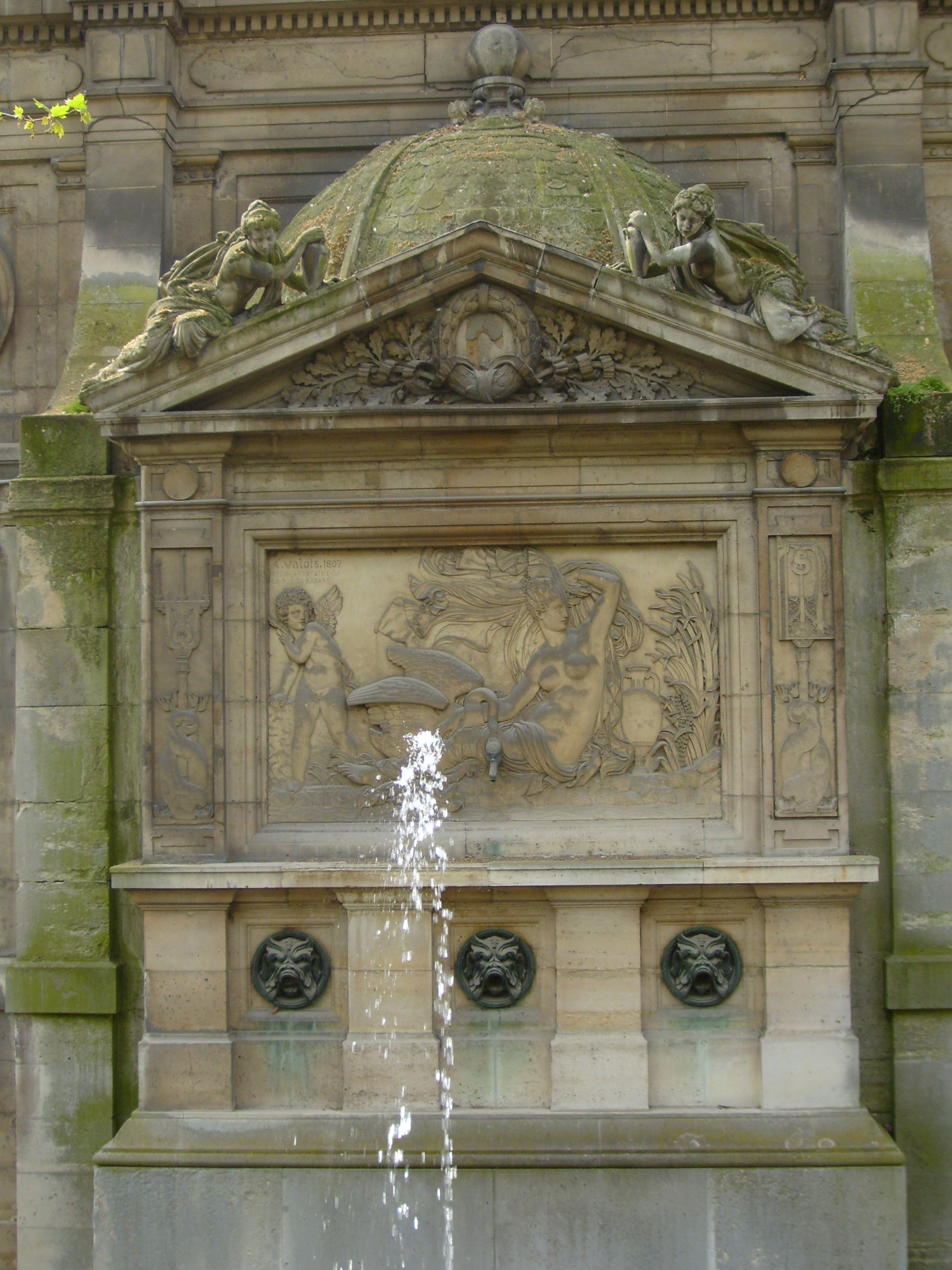
Fontaine de Léda, (1807), hidden behind the Medici Fountain in the Luxembourg Garden

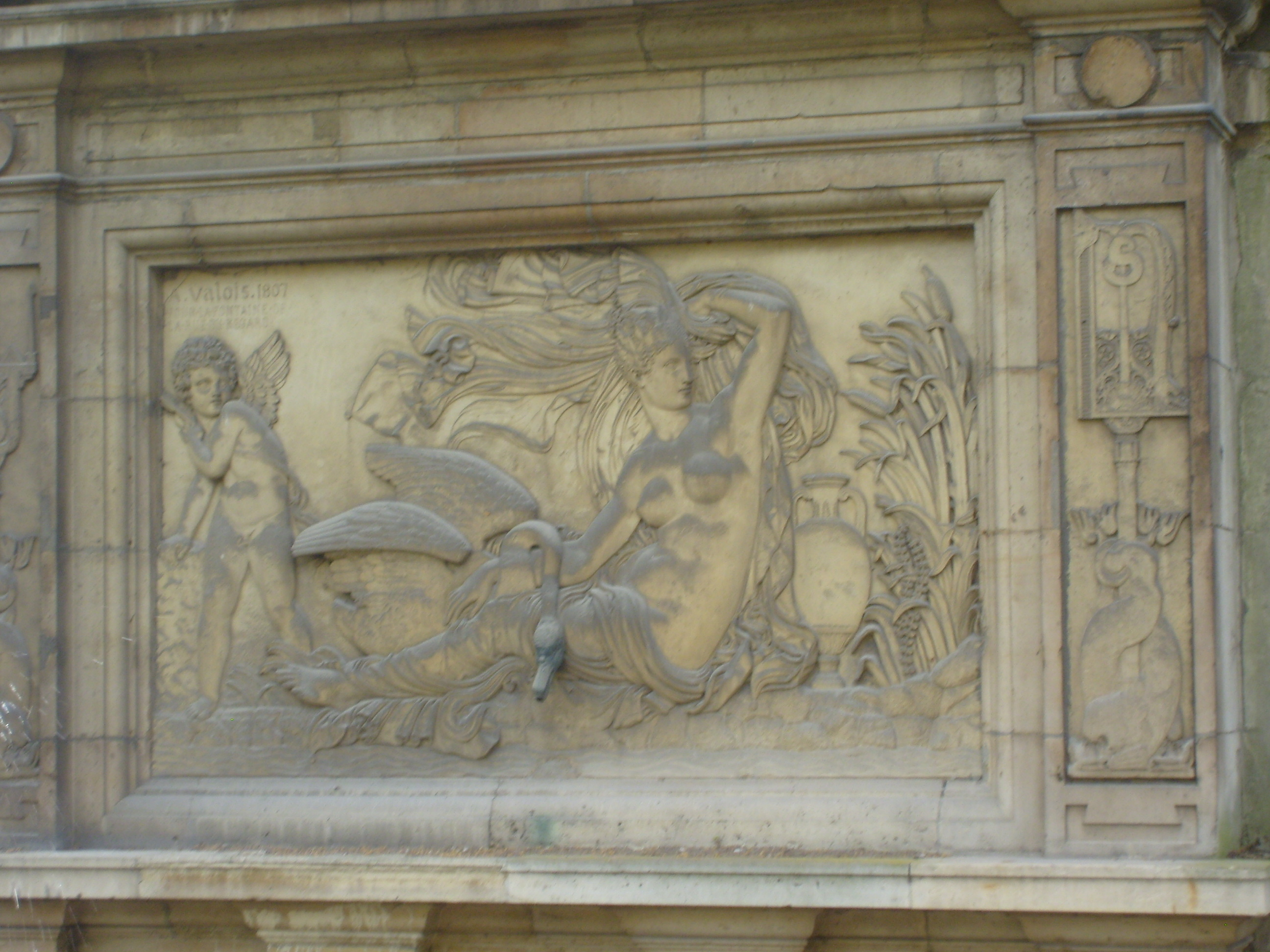
Fontaine de Léda (1807)

The Fontaine de Léda, also sometimes referred to as the Fontaine du Regard, is a Parisian sculptural wall fountain built in 1806–1808 during the reign of Napoleon Bonaparte. The fountain depicts the legend of Leda and the Swan, with a central bas-relief panel by Achille Valois. It was originally located at the corner of the rue de Vaugirard and rue du Regard, hence the alternative name; however, in 1864, during the reconstruction of Paris by Emperor Louis Napoleon, the fountain was moved to the back side of the Medici Fountain in the Luxembourg Garden, where it remains.

== History ==
The Fontaine de Léda was one of fifteen new Paris fountains commissioned by Napoleon Bonaparte in his decree of Saint Cloud on May 2, 1806. It was the project of the engineer responsible for the water supply of Paris, François-Jean Bralle, and the young sculptor Achille Valois (1785–1862). It was built against the wall of a private garden.

The fountain is composed of a bas-relief sculpture raised on a pedestal, between two pilasters with a pediment on top. An eagle, wings outspread and holding a crown of laurel, once decorated the pediment; it represented Napoleon's empire. The pilasters are decorated with sculptures of two intertwined dolphins: the one on the right around a ship's help, and the one on the left around a trident.

The bas-relief itself shows Leda and the swan surrounded by roses. In one corner, Cupid shoots an arrow from his bow. Leda holds the swan on her knees and the water flows from the beak of the swan, which is made of bronze. The water falls into a semi-elliptical basin at the foot of the fountain.

The fountain was condemned by the critic Amaury Duval in 1812 because of the subject of the bas-relief, Jupiter transforming himself into a swan to seduce Leda. He said, "Because of the ideas it calls to the imagination, this is hardly a suitable subject for a monument placed before the eyes of the public.". Nonetheless, the fountain was popular with the public. Its major failure was a lack of abundant water. Like all of the Paris fountains built before the completion of the canals and aqueducts commanded by Napoleon, it lacked water pressure; the water could only trickle in a thin stream from the Swan's beak.

In the late 1850s, during Emperor Louis Napoleon's reconstruction of the center of Paris, the Rue de Rennes was extended, and the wall against which the fountain was placed needed to be demolished. The architect of city parks and promenades, Gabriel Davioud, himself a sculptor, sought a way to preserve the fountain. He searched in vain for a public park or building where he could put it, and finally settled upon the Luxembourg Garden, where the Medici Fountain was in the process of being moved and rebuilt. The architect Alphonse de Gisors installed the Léda Fountain in its new home in 1864, attaching it to the back of the Medici Fountain and adding a demi-cupole on top and two naiades by the sculptor Jean-Baptiste-Jules Klagmann, and three bronze masquerons, or spouts in the form of masks, at the bottom. It appears that another sculptor modified the pediment of the fountain to eliminate the eagle, the symbol of Napoleon's empire.

== Bibliography ==
- Paris et ses fontaines, de la Renaissance à nos jours, texts assembled by Dominque Massounie, Pauline-Prevost-Marcilhacy and Daniel Rabreau, Délegation a l'action artistique de la Ville de Paris. From the Collection Paris et son Patrimoine, directed by Beatrice de Andia. Paris, 1995.

== Notes and Sources ==
- Poisson, Michel (1999). Paris Buildings and Monuments, p. 209. New York: Harry N. Abrams. ISBN 9780810943551.
