= Place du Châtelet =

Public square in Paris, France

- Public Square
- {{{other_names}}}
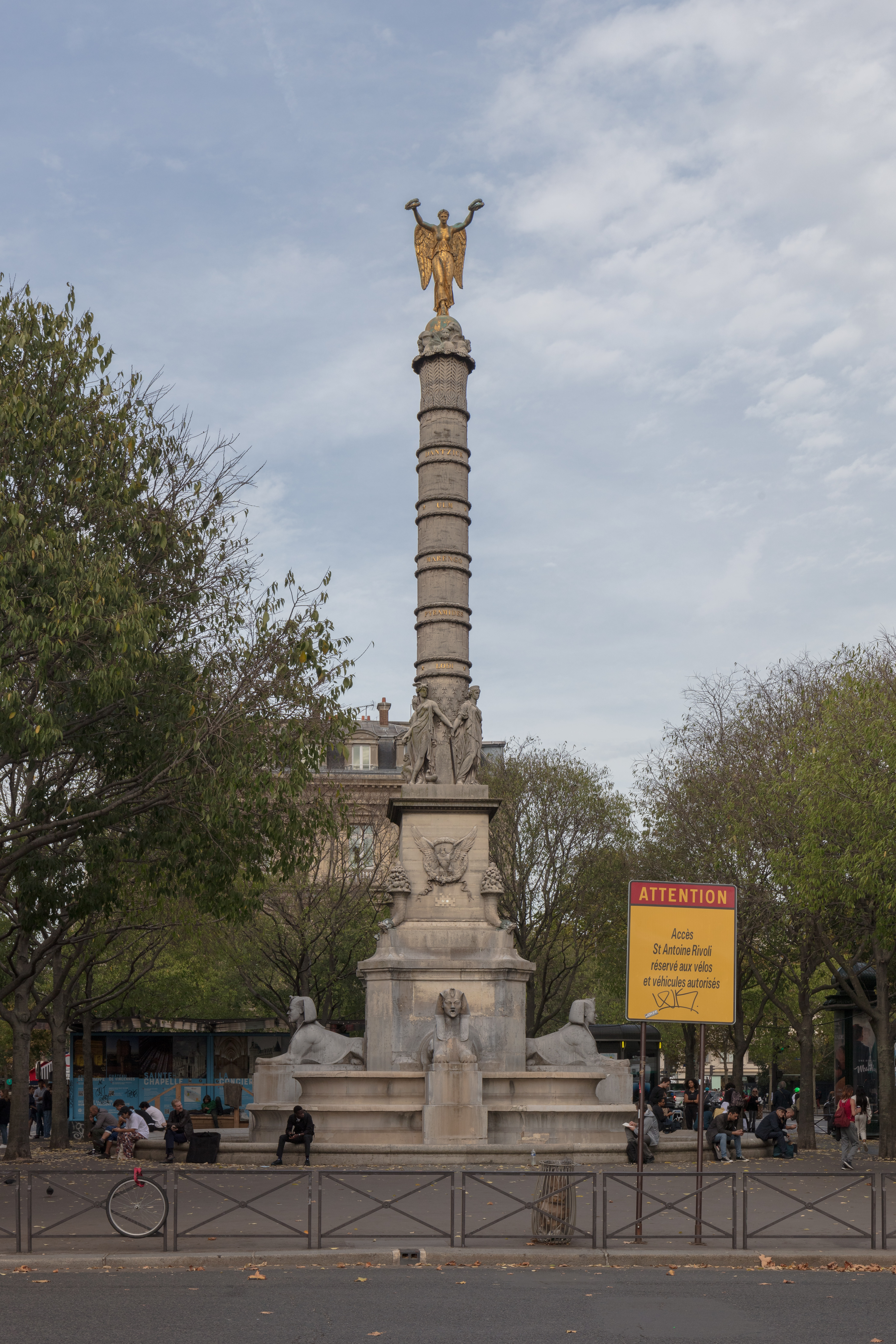
- Fontaine du Palmier in the Place du Châtelet, 2022
- Features: Fontaine du Palmier, Théâtre du Châtelet, Théâtre de la Ville
- Constructed: 1802-1810
- Opened: 1810
- Location: Paris
- Location within Paris
- Coordinates: 48°51′27.5″N 2°20′50.5″E

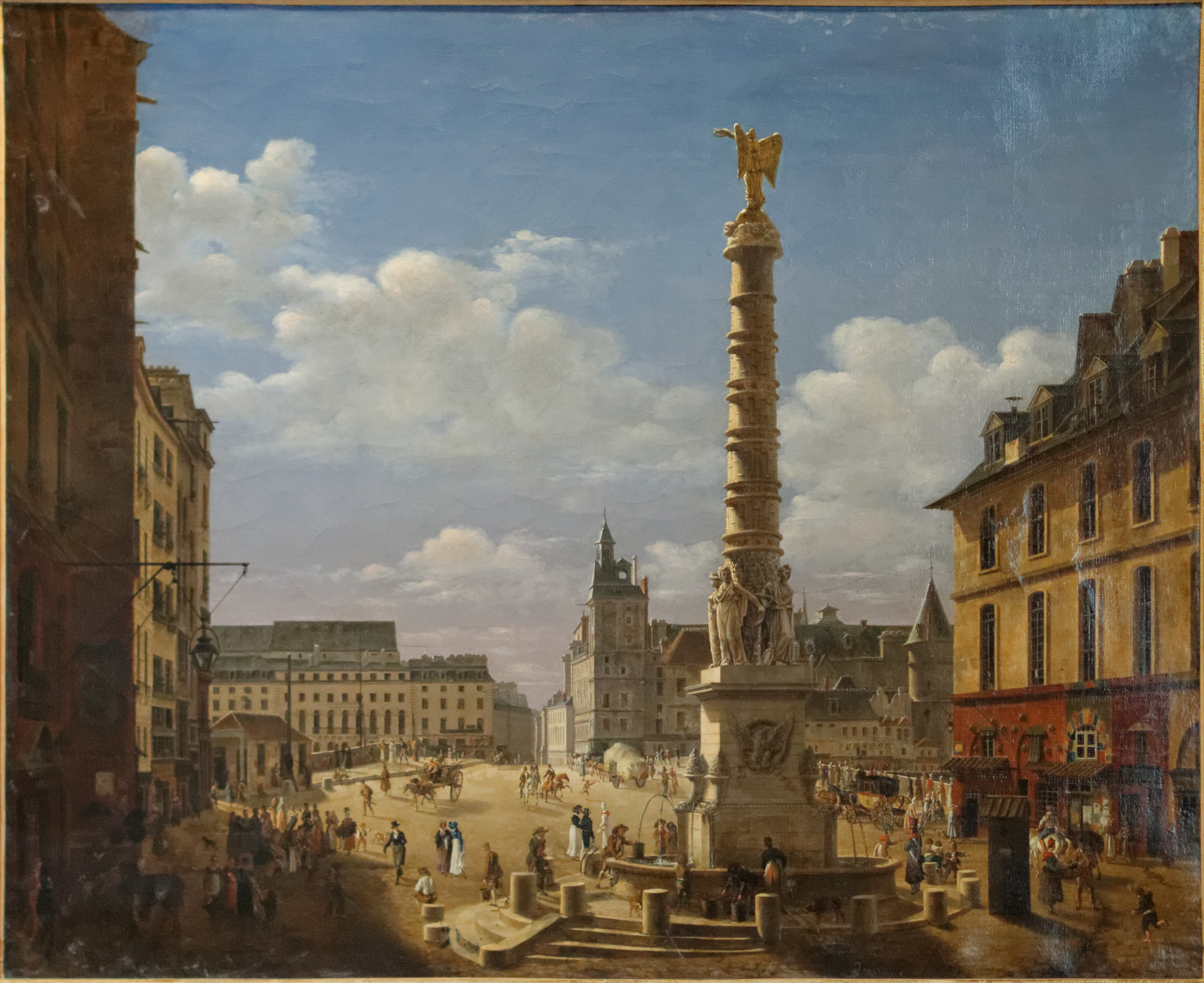
La Place du Châtelet by Étienne Bouhot (1810)

The Place du Châtelet (French pronunciation: [plas dy ʃɑtlɛ]) is a public square in Paris, on the right bank of the river Seine, on the borderline between the 1st and 4th arrondissements. It lies at the north end of the Pont au Change, a bridge that connects the Île de la Cité, near the Palais de Justice and the Conciergerie, to the right bank. The closest métro station is Châtelet

== Features ==
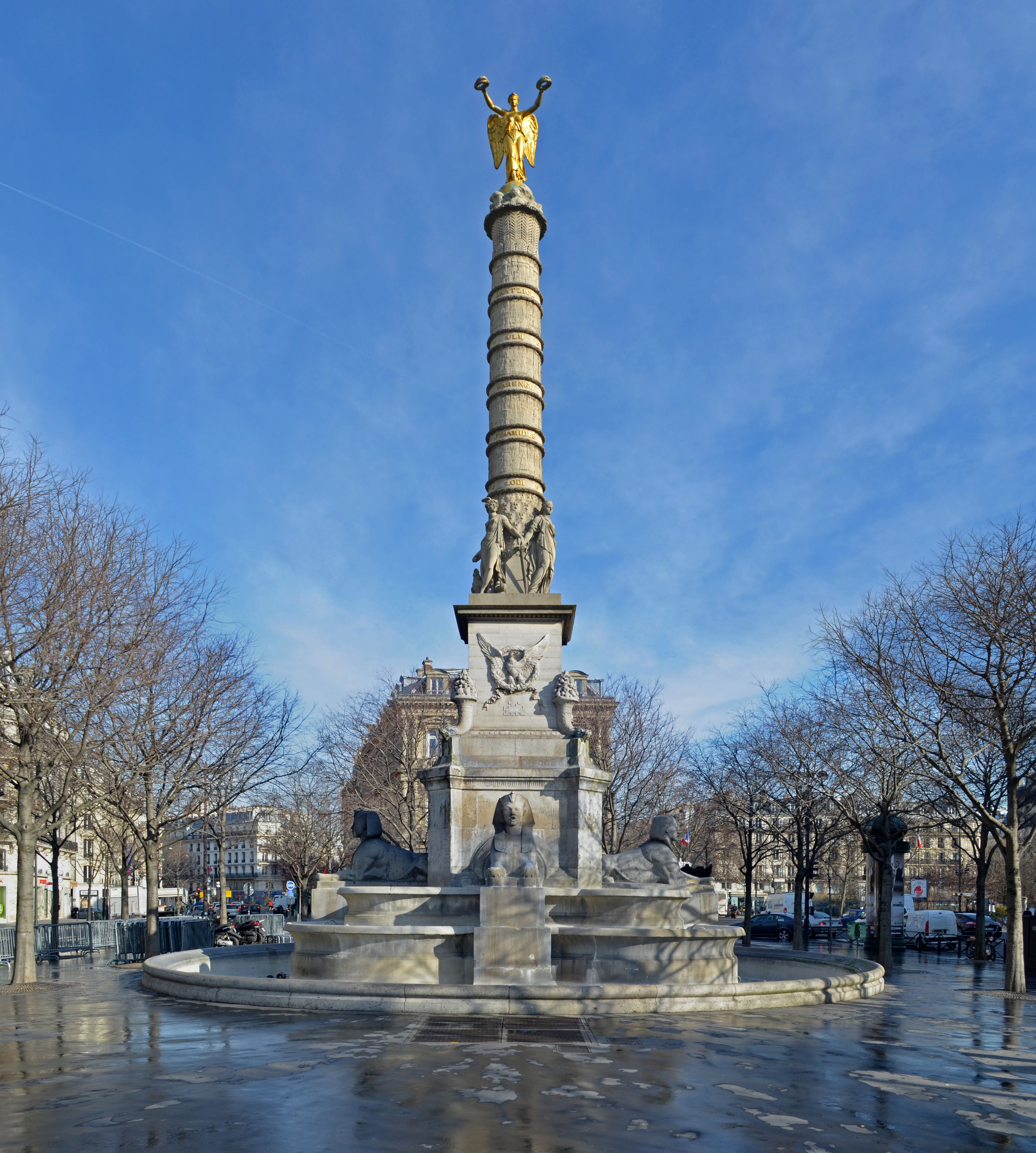
La Fontaine du Palmier in the Place du Châtelet

The name "Châtelet" refers to the stronghold, the Grand Châtelet, that guarded the northern end of the Pont au Change, containing the offices of the prévôt de Paris and a number of prisons, until it was demolished from 1802 to 1810.

At the square's center is the Fontaine du Palmier, designed in 1806 by architect and engineer François-Jean Bralle (1750-1832) to celebrate French victories in battle. It has a circular basin, 6 m (20 ft) in diameter, from which a column rises in the form of a palm tree's trunk 18 m (59 ft) tall. The palm trunk is surmounted by a gilded figure of the goddess, Victory, holding a laurel wreath in each upraised hand; the goddess figure stands on a base ornamented with bas-relief eagles. The gilded finial is by sculptor Louis-Simon Boizot.

Four allegorical figures also by Boizot ring the base of the fountain: Prudence, Temperance, Justice, and Strength. From top to bottom, bands of bronze gilt pay tribute to the victories achieved in the following battles: the Siege of Danzig (1807), the Battle of Ulm (1805), the Battle of Marengo (1800), the Battle of the Pyramids (1798), and the Battle of Lodi (1796). Its sphinxes were designed in 1858 by Gabriel Davioud and sculpted by Henri Alfred Jacquemart (1824-1896); they commemorate Napoleon's victory in Egypt.

Two identical-looking theatres stand facing the square, the Théâtre du Châtelet and the Théâtre de la Ville, both designed by architect Gabriel Davioud and completed between 1860 and 1862 as part of Baron Haussmann's grand reconfiguration of Paris.

== Gallery ==
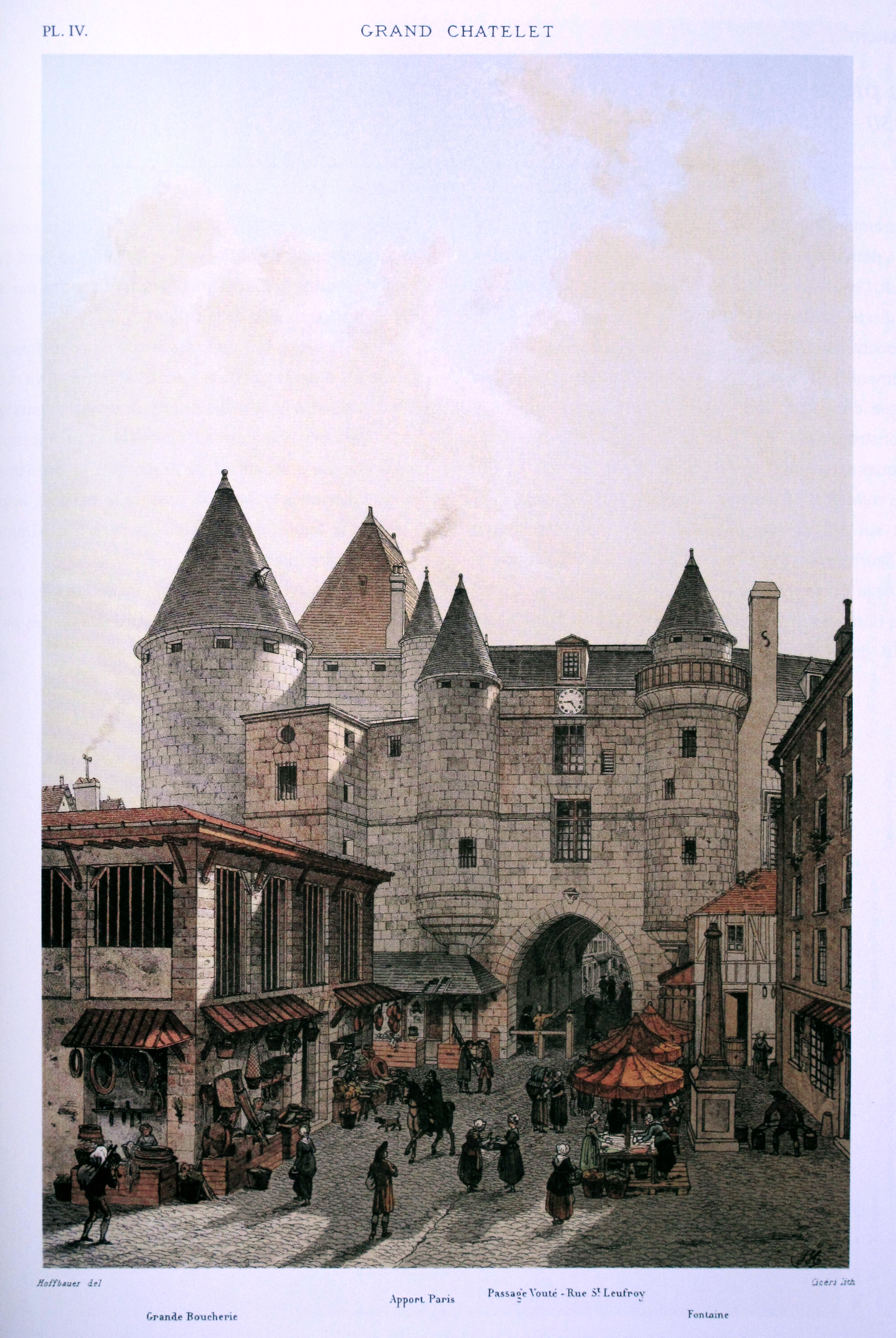
The Grand Châtelet from rue Saint-Denis (1800)

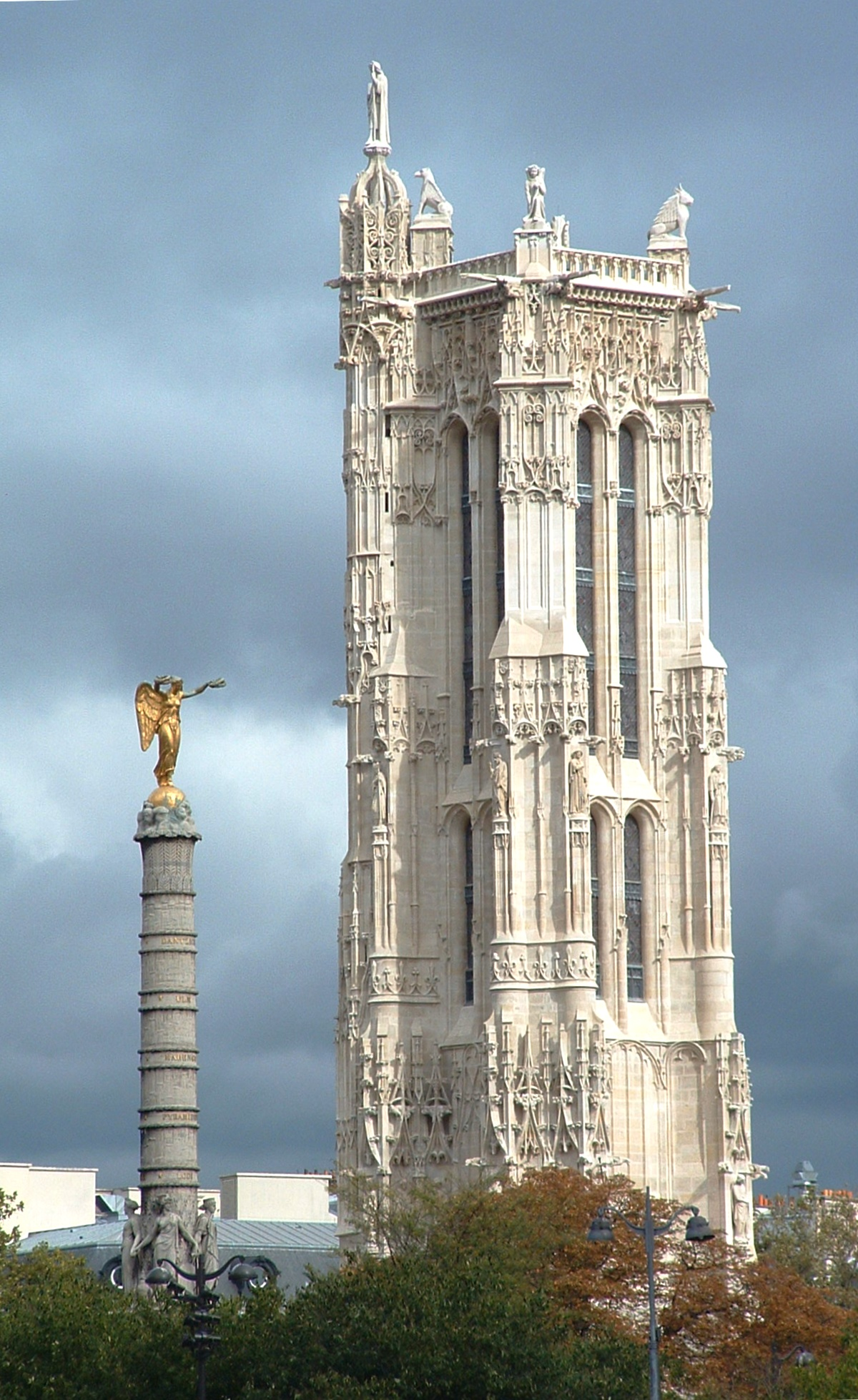
The Victory Column with the Saint-Jacques Tower

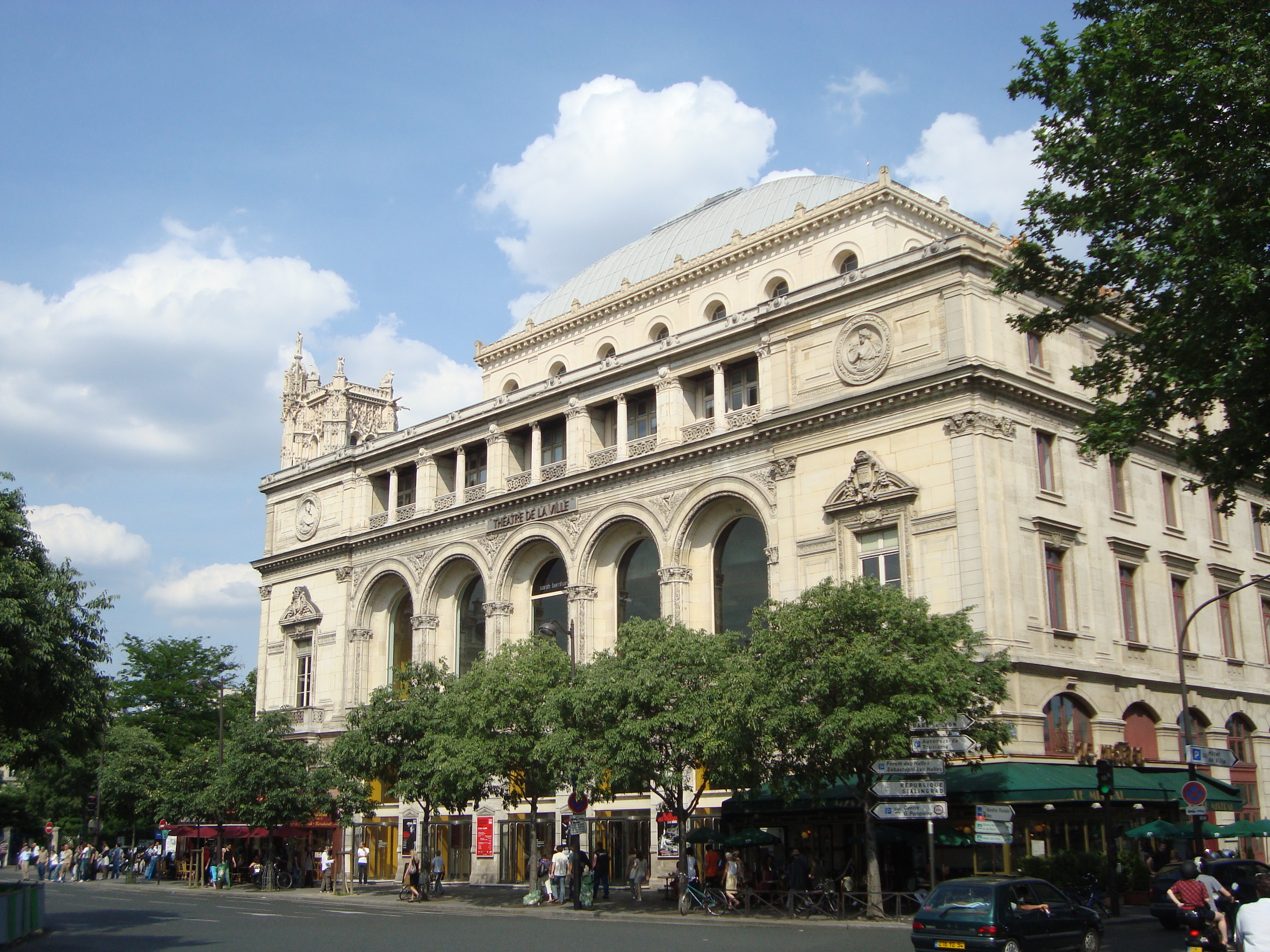
Théâtre de la Ville

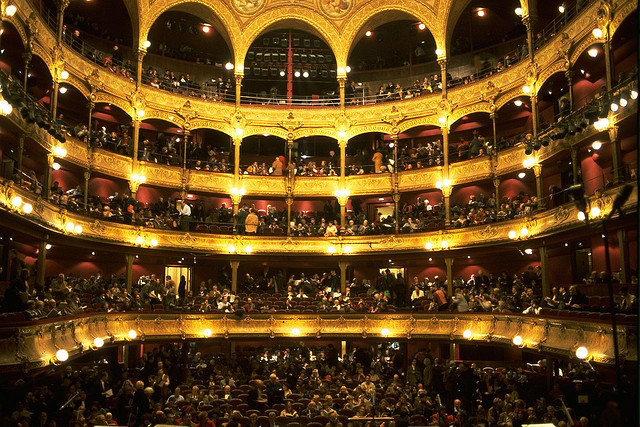
Interior of the Théâtre du Châtelet

== Sources ==
- The History of Paris from the Earliest Period to the Present Day, London : printed for Geo. B. Whittaker, Ave-Maria Lane, 1825, vol. 3, page 122.

== See also ==
- Châtelet - Les Halles (Paris RER)
- Fountains in Paris
