= François-Jean Bralle =

French architect and engineer (1750–1832)

François-Jean Bralle (11 January 1750 – 12 June 1832) was a French architect and engineer, best known as for the construction of fountains in Paris during the time of Napoleon Bonaparte. Bralle was commissioned to build fifteen new fountains in Paris, including the fontaine de Mars, the fontaine du Fellah, and the Fontaine du Palmier in the Place du Châtelet, which are still functioning today.

== Bralle and the fountains of the Decree of Saint Cloud ==
Bralle was a specialist in hydraulic engineering. During the French Revolution and under the French Consulate of Napoleon, he was named director of the machine de Marly, which pumped water from Seine to feed to fountains of the Gardens of Versailles. He was also in charge of the pumps of Chaillot, of Gros-Caillou, and La Samaritaine, which pumped water from the Seine to provide drinking water to the people of Paris.

On May 2, 1806, Napoleon issued the Decree of Saint Cloud, which began, "Beginning next July 1, water will flow from all the fountains of Paris day and night, in a manner to provide water not only for individual persons and the needs of the public, but also to refresh the atmosphere and to clean the streets." The decree ordered that existing fountains be cleaned and put into working order and supplied with fresh water from aqueducts, that steam and hydraulic pumps be repaired, and that "In the city of Paris fifteen new fountains will be erected, for which the projects will be submitted to the Minister of the Interior."

The project of supplying water and building the fountains was given to Francois-Jean Bralle, who held the title of Chef du service des eaux de la Ville de Paris. He was given a budget of 540,000 francs in 1806 to build the fountains, and an additional sum of 80,000 francs was added in 1808 to finish the project. Bralle in turn commissioned several different architects to design the fountains. Architects of new buildings, such as Gondoin, Brongniart and Vaudoyer, were commissioned to create new fountains in front of the new buildings they designed.

The fountains commissioned by Bralle under the May 2, 1806 decree were to be located at:

- The Marché des Jacobins, rue Saint-Honoré
- The château d'eau, place Tribunat. (not constructed).
- above the sewers, place des Trois Marie
- On a new place at the far end of the Pont au Change. The Fontaine de la Paix, now on the allee de Seminaire.
- At the foot of the water main of Saint-Jean le Rond, against the wall of the church of Notre-Dame
- At the foot of the water main, rue des Lions Saint-Paul
- Rue Popincourt, next to the army barracks
- Rue Saint-Dominique, at Gros Caillou, next to the army barracks (The Fontaine de Mars)
- On the Place of the Palais des Arts. (Fountain closed in 1865, and statuary of lions moved to square Boulogne-Billancourt.)
- On rue des Sèvres, at the hospice for incurable patients. (Fontaine du Fellah.)
- One the place of the intersection of rue de Vaugirard, rue d'Assis, and rue de l'Ouest. The Fontaine de Leda, now hidden behind the Medici Fountain in the Luxembourg Garden.
- On the place Saint-Sulpice
- On the place in front of the lycee Bonaparte, rue Caumartin
- Rue Mouffetard, between rue Censier and rue Fer-a-Moulin. (demolished 1866-67 to make room for Rue Monge).
- The square at the end of the rue du Jardin des Plantes.

Fourteen of the fifteen fountains on the plan were constructed by Bralle between 1806 and 1808. They were built by many different architects, in many different styles, ranging from Egyptian to classical. They all shared the same problem; a shortage of water. Before the completion of the new canal Napoleon was building to bring water to Paris, the best they could provide was a thin stream of water from several different spouts; there was not enough water pressure to shoot water upwards.

== The fountains of Bralle today ==
During the reconstructions of Paris that followed the French Empire, particularly during the Second French Empire of Napoleon III, several were demolished or moved to new locations. The most important of the fountains of Bralle still existing are:

- The Fontaine du Palmier, Place du Châtelet
- The Fontaine du Fellah, on Rue de Sèvres
- The Fontaine de Léda, hidden behind the Medici Fountain, Luxembourg Garden

== Bibliography ==
- Paris et ses fontaines, de la Renaissance à nos jours, texts assembled by Dominque Massounie, Pauline-Prevost-Marcilhacy and Daniel Rabreau, Délegation a l'action artistique de la Ville de Paris. from the Collection Paris et son Patrimoine, directed by Beatrice de Andia. Paris, 1995.
