= Mâcon Cathedral =

Roman Catholic church in Mâcon, France

Coordinates: 46°18′25″N 4°50′7″E

Mâcon Cathedral Cathédrale Saint-Vincent de Mâcon
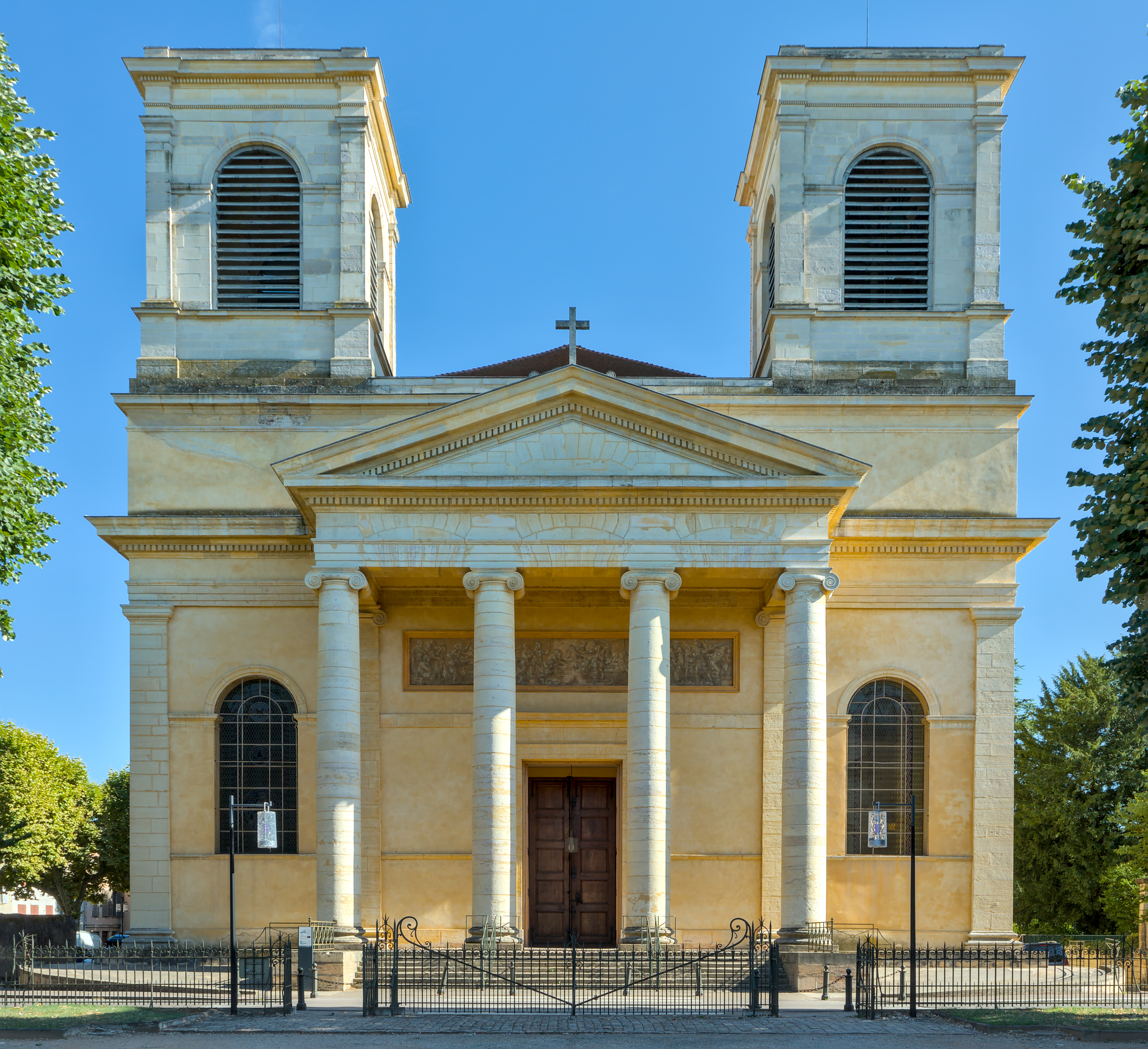
- Mâcon Cathedral

Religion
- Affiliation: Roman Catholic Church
- Province: Bishop of Mâcon
- Region: Bourgogne
- Rite: Roman
- Ecclesiastical or organisational status: Cathedral
- Status: Active

Location
- Location: Mâcon, France
- Interactive map of Mâcon Cathedral; Cathédrale Saint-Vincent de Mâcon

Architecture
- Type: church
- Style: Byzantine
- Groundbreaking: 19th century

Mâcon Cathedral (French: Cathédrale Saint-Vincent de Mâcon) is a Roman Catholic church located in Mâcon, Burgundy, France. The cathedral is in the neoclassical architectural style typical for its time.

It was formerly the seat of the Bishop of Mâcon, abolished under the Concordat of 1801 and merged into the Diocese of Autun.

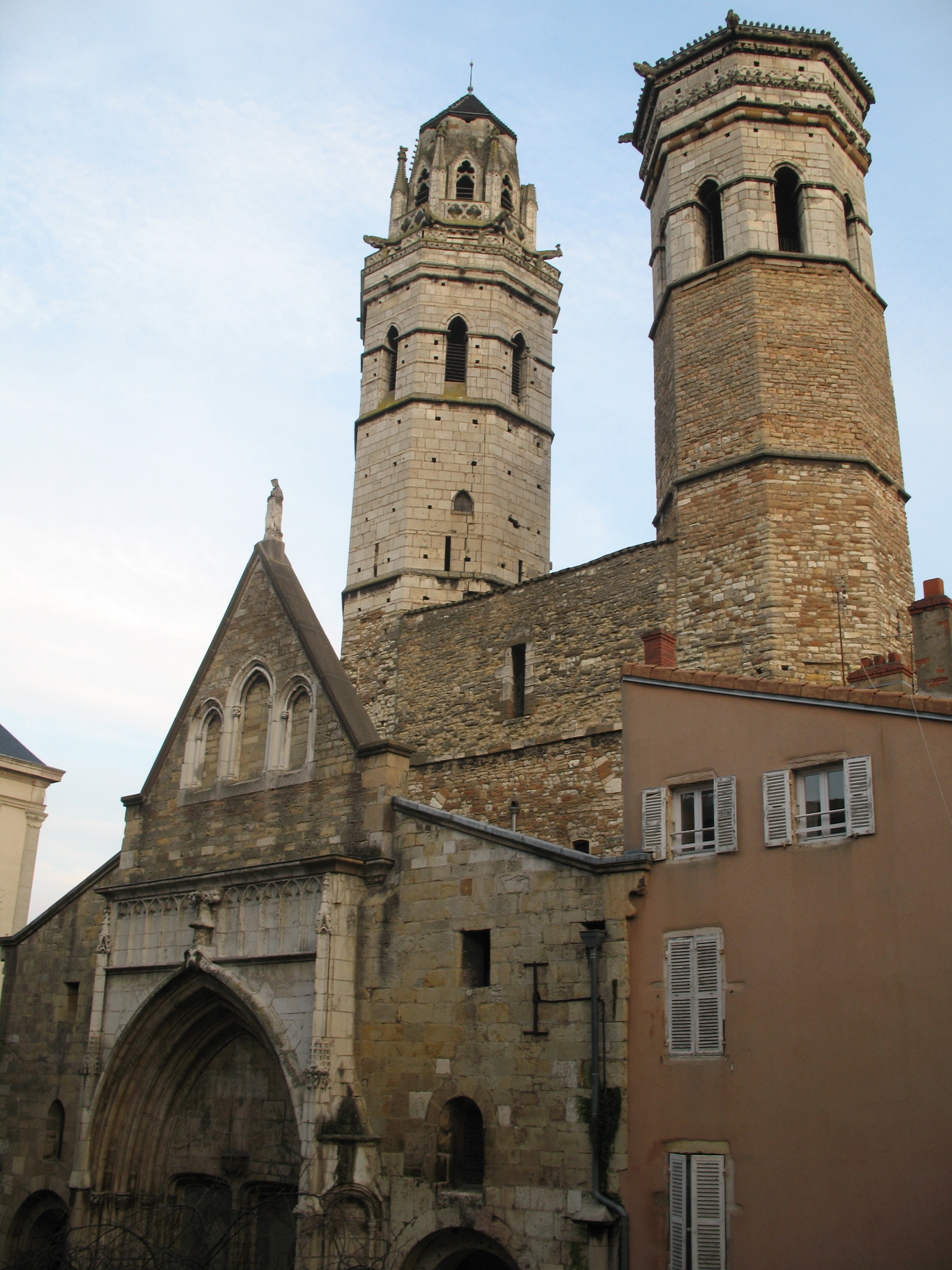
The old cathedral

The present church (Église cathédrale Saint-Vincent de Mâcon) was built between 1808 and 1818 under the supervision of the architect Alexandre de Gisors. Of its predecessor, known as "Vieux Saint-Vincent" (Old St. Vincent), there remain two towers, a narthex and a tympanum. The highly distinctive south tower, which is topped by a belvedere, serves as a symbol of Mâcon.
