= Achille Valois =

French sculptor

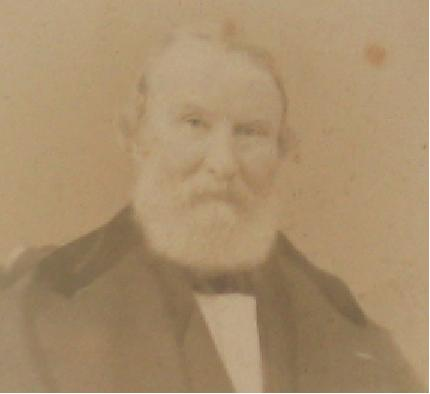
Achille Valois

Achille-Joseph-Étienne Valois (French pronunciation: [aʃil ʒozɛf etjɛn valwa]; 13 January 1785 — 17 December 1862) was a French designer and sculptor who studied for a time in the atelier of Jacques-Louis David and whose sculptural works may be seen in Paris. He also studied with Antoine-Denis Chaudet.

== Career ==
Among his early works is the Fontaine de Léda (1806–08) in Fontainebleau style re-sited in the Jardin du Luxembourg. At the restoration of the Bourbons he hastened to execute a bust of Louis XVIII. In 1816 he sculpted a portrait of Madame Royale the duchesse d'Angoulême, eldest daughter of the late Louis XVI. His bust of the sculptor Antoine-Denis Chaudet, with whom he had also studied, exhibited at the Salon of 1817, was bought in 1820 for the Musée des Beaux-Arts, Angers. He contributed a marble bas-relief of children representing Medicine intended for a fountain in Place de la Bastille (1817) colossal statues of Louis XVI for Montpellier and the cast-iron Pêche des coquillages (1838–40) to the central Fontaines de la Concorde, designed by Jacques Ignace Hittorff for Place de la Concorde. Between 1816 and 1827 he produced a statue of Louis XVI, which originally stood in Montpellier before being given as a gift to the city of Louisville, Kentucky in 1966.

As a draughtsman, Valois produced a drawing of the triumphal arrival of celebrated works of art from the Vatican in Paris, 1798, that was copied on a Sèvres porcelain "Etruscan" vase (Vase Étrusque à rouleaux) in 1813.

Valois was made a Chevalier of the Légion d'Honneur in 1825.
