= Guy de Gisors =

French architect

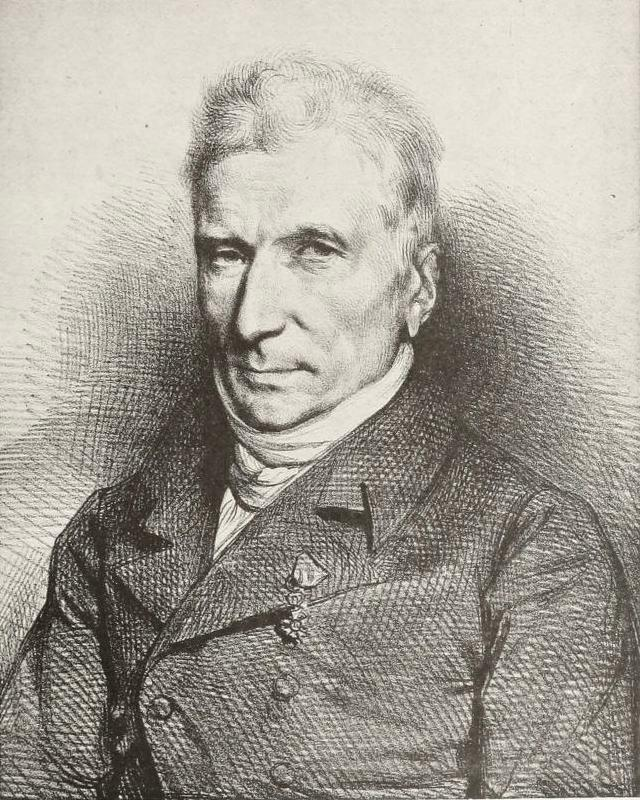
Guy de Gisors

Alexandre-Jean-Baptiste-Guy de Gisors (20 September 1762 – 6 May 1835) was a French architect, a member of the Gisors family of architects and prominent government administrators responsible for the construction and preservation of many public buildings in Paris.

== Early training and family ==
Guy de Gisors was born in Paris, where he attended the Académie Royale d’Architecture and was a student of Jean-François Chalgrin. He was the cousin of Jacques-Pierre Gisors (1755–1818) and the uncle of Alphonse de Gisors (1796–1866), and collaborated with Jacques-Pierre on the design of the assembly hall for the Conseil des Cinq-Cents in the Palais-Bourbon (1795–1797).

== Later career ==
He participated in the planning of Napoléonville in 1808 and in about 1810 took over the ongoing designs for the Piazza del Popolo in Rome, succeeding Giuseppe Valadier and adhering to Valadier's grand plan. However, his most important work was the design of the Saint-Vincent Cathedral in Mâcon in 1816.

Administrative positions included Architecte du Corps Législatif et des Archives Nationales (1811), Inspecteur Général des Bâtiments Civils (1811–1832), Architecte des Casernes des Sapeurs-Pompiers de Paris (1824–1831), member of the Conseil Consultatif des Bâtiments de la Couronne (1825–1830) and architect (1831–1835) to Louis-Philippe.

Guy de Gisors died in Paris.
