= List of fountains in Paris =

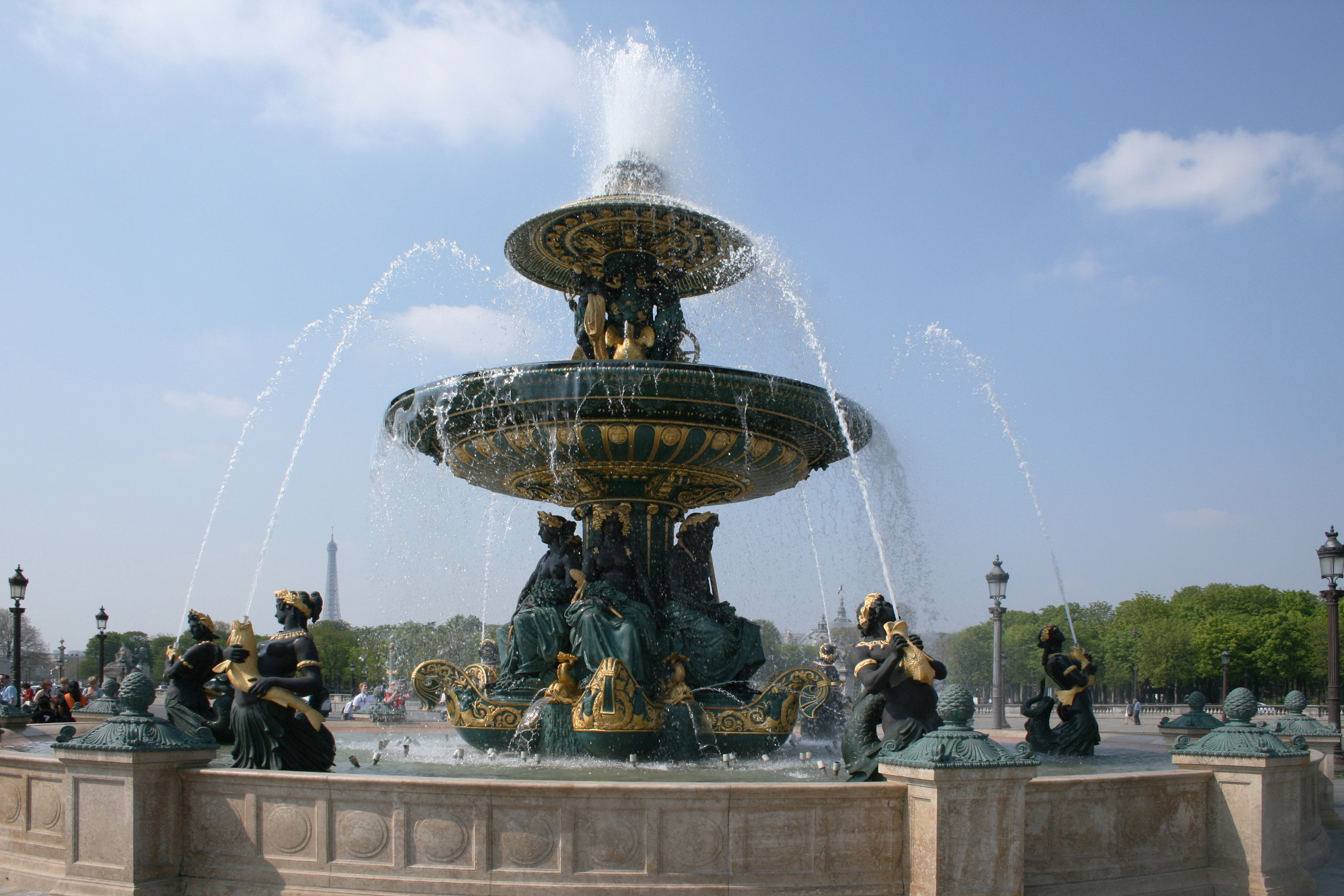
Fontaines de la Concorde (1836–1840)

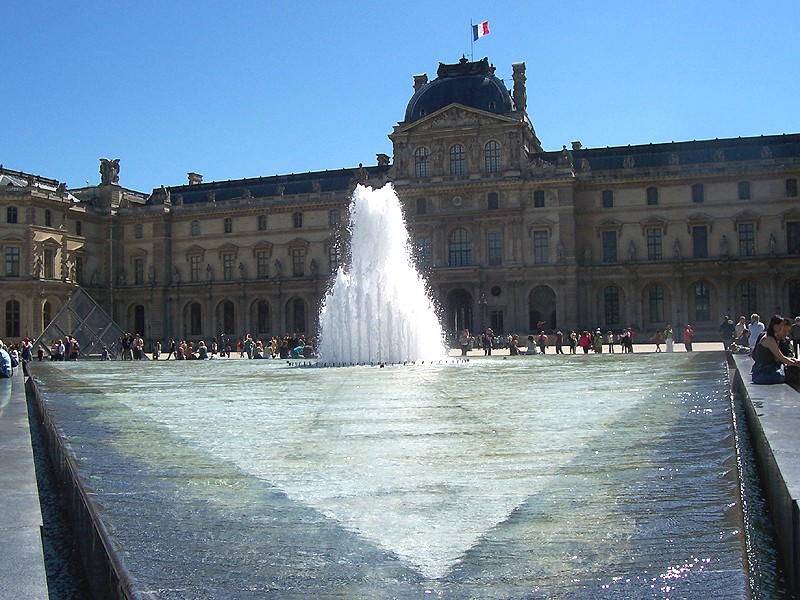
Fontaine de la Pyramide, Cour Napoléon of the Louvre, (1988)

The list of Paris fountains, existing and destroyed, is arranged by arrondissement below.

For the history of Paris fountains, see Fountains in Paris.

== 1st arrondissement ==
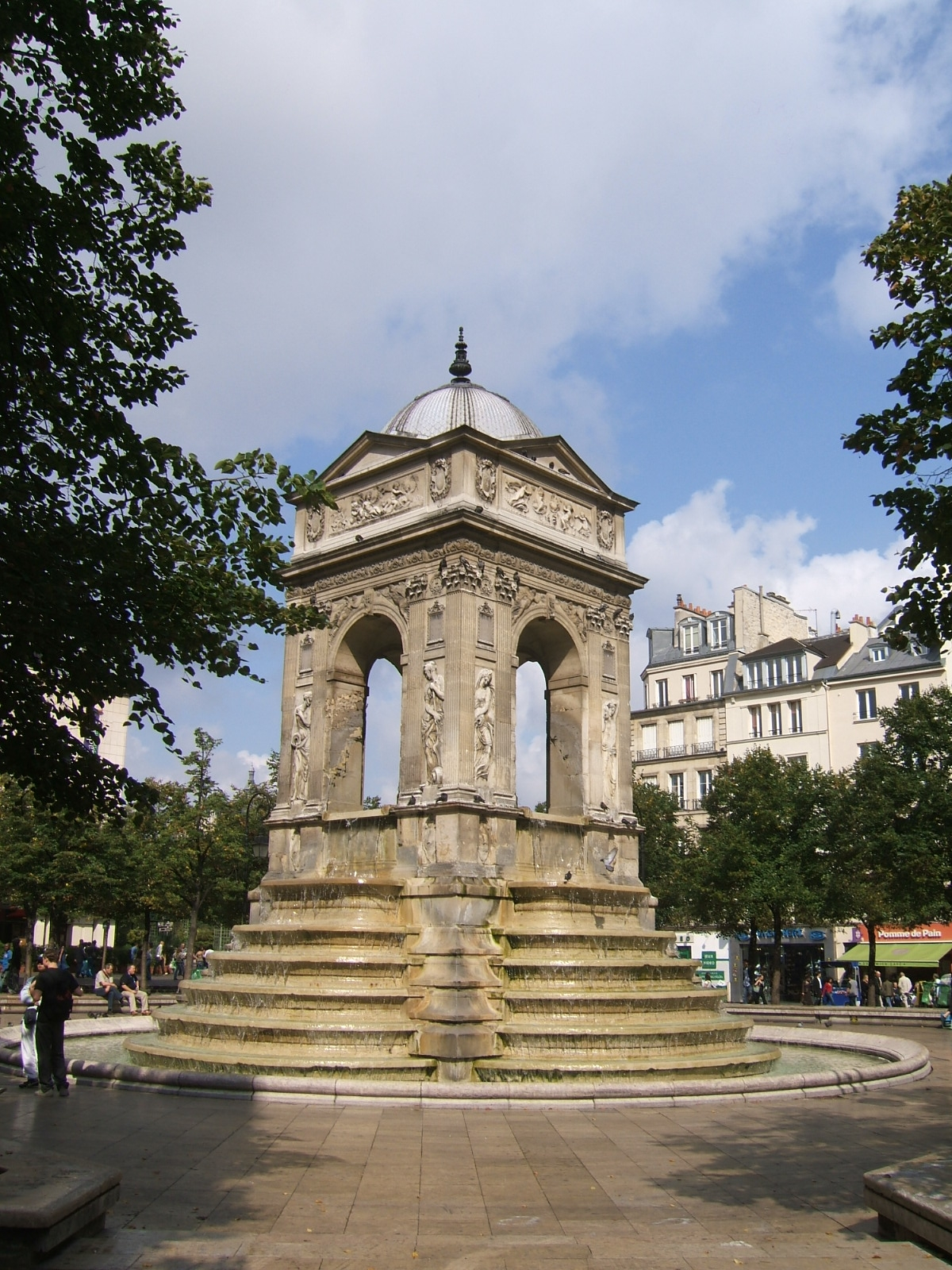
Fontaine des Innocents 1549, (1st arrondissement)

Fontaine des Innocents, Corner of rue aux fers and rue Saint-Denis, later Place des Innocents. Built as a wall fountain in 1549, moved and transformed into a free-standing fountain in 1789, modified again during Second French Empire. Pierre Lescot, architect, Jean Goujon, sculptor.

Fontaine de a Pompe de la Samaritaine. On the second arch of the Pont Neuf, on the side of the quai de la Corde. Built in 1549 and in operation until 1710, it was finally destroyed in 1816.

Château d'eau de la Croix du Trahoir. The corner of rue de l'Arbre Sec and rue Saint Honoré. Rebuilt in 1606, moved in 1636, rebuilt in 1775. Jacques-Germain Soufflot, architect, Louis-Simon Boizot, sculptor.

Fontaine Sainte-Anne. In the courtyard of the palace on the Île de la Cité. Built in 1626 bt architect Augustin Guilain and sculptor Pierre Bernard. Destroyed (?).

Fontaine de Pilori des Halles. In the Marché des Halle next to the pillory. Built 1601 by architect Pierre Guillan. Destroyed about 1820.

Château d'eau du Palais Royale. Place du Palais Royale, 1719. Destroyed in 1848.

Château d'eau des Tuileries. At the entrance of the Tuileries Garden, at the corner of Rue Saint-Florentin and Place Louis XV (now Place de la Concorde.) Built between 1765 and 1770, destroyed about 1820.

Fontaine de l'Apport Paris. In the square in front of the Grand Châtelet, at the beginning of rue Saint-Denis. Built 1623, Destroyed in the 19th century.

Fontaine du Diable. Corner of rue Saint-Louis and rue de l'Echelle. 1759. Probably by Jean-Baptiste Augustin Beausire. Built 1759, destroyed (?).

Fontaine de la Halle-aux-Blés. Rue de Viarmes, at the foot of the column of Soissons. Built about 1764.

Fontaine du marché Saint-Honoré. Built during the First Empire by the architect Molinos. Destroyed in 1956.

Fontaine de la Pointe Saint-Eustache. Pointe Saint-Eustache, built 1806 by architect François-Jean Bralle.

Fontaine de la place du quai de l'Ecole. Place quai de l'Ecole. Built 1806 by architect François-Jean Bralle. Moved in 1835 and later destroyed.

Fontaine du Palmier in Place du Châtelet. Built 1806–1808 by architects François-Jean Bralle and sculptor Louis-Simon Boizot. Moved and rebuilt in 1856, restored 1896–1901.

Fontaine Molière. 37 rue de Richelieu. Replaced the Fontaine Richelieu, by Jean Beausire, (about 1671.) The Fontaine Molière was built in 1841–44 by architect Louis Visconti and sculptors Bernard Gabriel Seurre and James Pradier.

Fontaines de la place du Théâtre-Français. Place André Malraux. These two fountains were built in 1867–1874 by architect Gabriel Davioud and sculptors Albert Ernest Carrier-Belleuse, Mathurin Moreau, Louis-Adolphe Eude, Charles Gauthier and François-Théophile Murgey.

Fontaine de la Cossonnerie, 12 rue de la Cossonnerie, (1979), Pierre Mougin, architect

Les Deux Plateaux, Cour d'Honneur of the Palais Royale, (1985–86). Patrick Bouchain, architect and Daniel Buren, sculptor.

Fontaine Berger, Jardin des Halles, (1988), Louis Arrretche, architect.

Fontaine Jules-Supervielle, Allée Jules Supervielle, Jardin des Halles, (1983), Jean Willerval and André Lagarde, architects

Fontaine Nymphée, Jardin des Halles, (1988), Louis Arretche, architect

Fontaine de la Pyramide, Cour Napoleon of the Louvre, (1988), I. M. Pei, architect.

Fontaine Saint-Eustache, Jardin des Halles, (1988), Louis Arretche, architect.

Fontaine Saint-John Perse, Allée Saint-Jean-Perse, Jardin des Halles, (1988), Louis Arretche, architect.

Fontaines Sphérades, Cour d'Honneur of the Palais Royale, (1985), Pol Bury, sculptor.

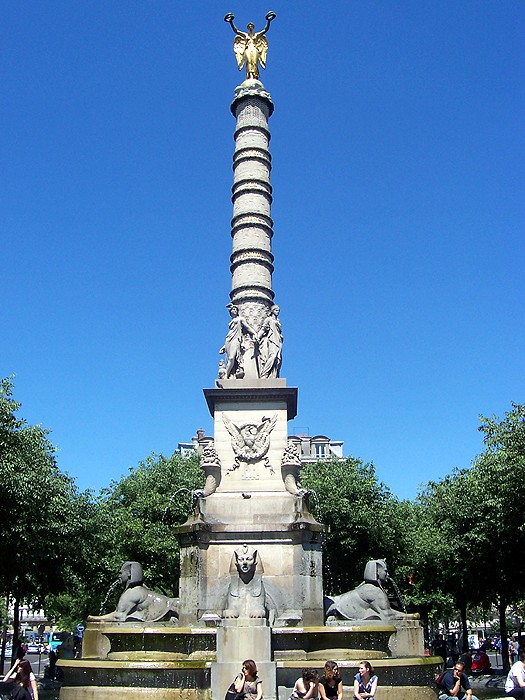
Fontaine du Palmier, 1806–1808, (1st arrondissement)

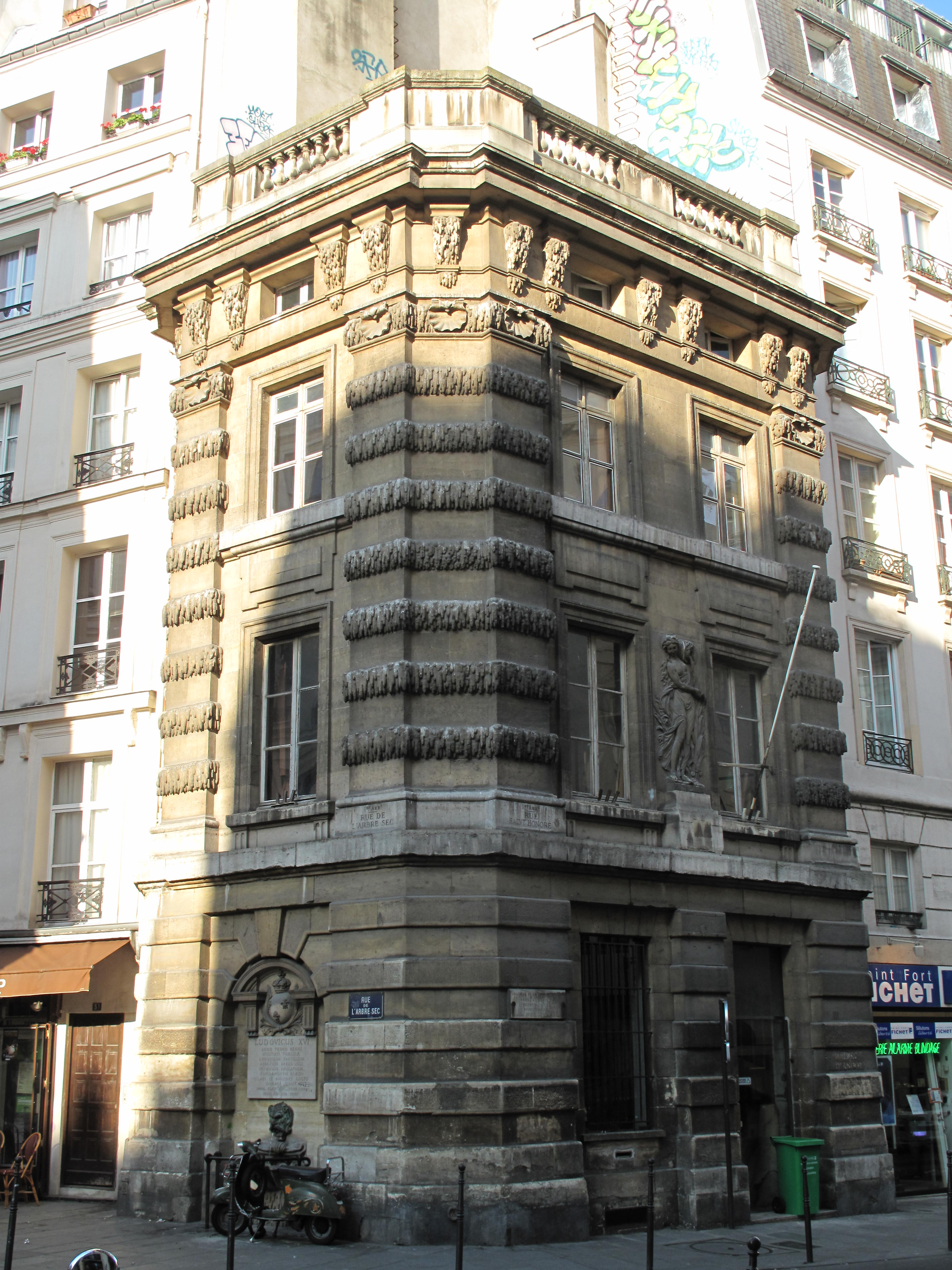
Chateau d'eau de la Croix du Trahoir, 1606, moved 1636, rebuilt by Louis XVI in 1775. (1st arrondissement.)

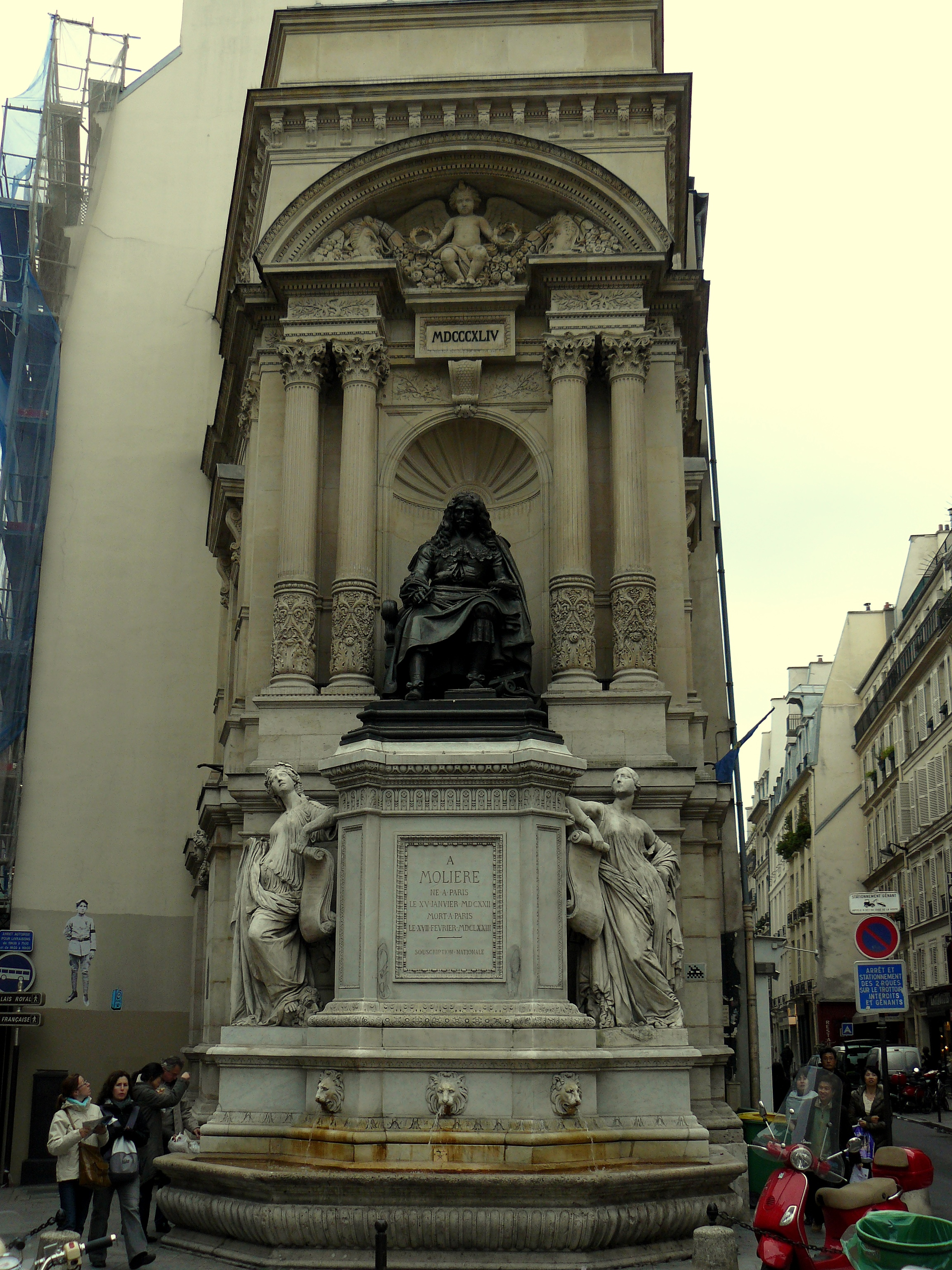
Fontaine Molière 1841–1844, (1st arrondissement)

== 2nd arrondissement ==
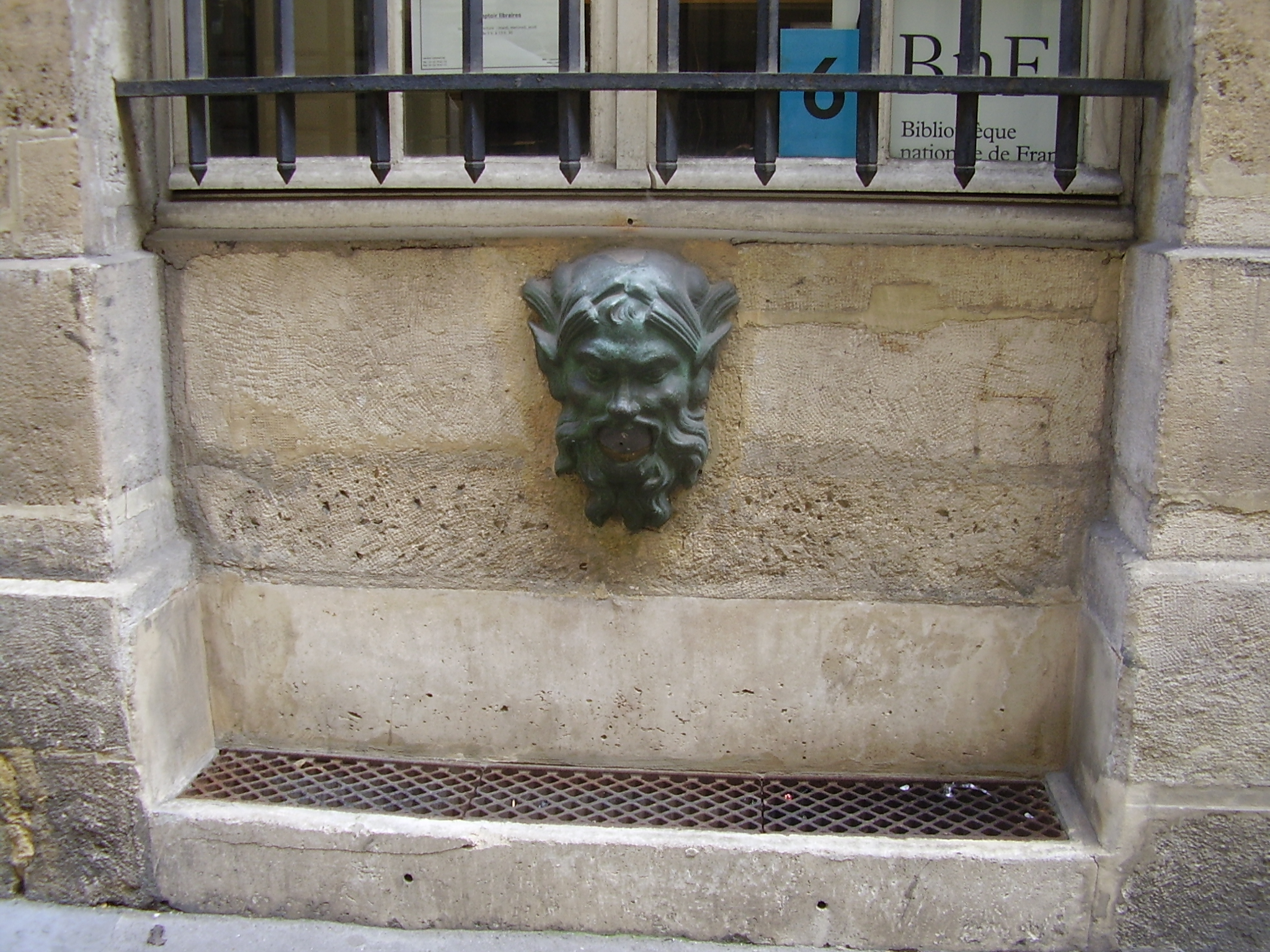
Fontaine Colbert (1708)

Fontaine du Ponceau, at the corner of rue Saint-Denis and rue du Ponceau, (about 1529, reconstructed in 1605 by Pierre Guillain, then in 1729 by Jean Beausire.

Fontaine des Petits-Pères Noirs, Rue du Mail in the wall of the Abbey. (1671). Probably reconstructed by Jean Beausirsire (1726)

Fontaine Colbert, Rue Colbert (1708). Jean Beausire, architect.

Fontaine de la rue Montmartre, or Fontaine Desmarets, Rue Montmartre (1713), Jean Beausire, architect (destroyed.)

Fontaine Louis-le-Grand (also known as Fontaine d'Antin), Rue d'Antin, (1707), Jean Beausire, architect. Destroyed in 1828 and replaced by the Fontaine Gaillon.

Fontaine du Ponceau, Rue des Egouts, facing rue Saint-Martin, (1810). Gerard, architect. Destroyed.

Fontaine de la Reine, (or de la Reynie, or Grenata). At the corner of rue Saint-Denis and rue Grenata. (Reconstructed 1732.). Jean and Jean-Baptiste-Augustin Beausire, architects.

Fontaine Gaillon, 1 place Gaillon. (1828). Louis Visconti, architect. Georges Jacquot, François Derre and Combette, sculptors.

Fontaine de la place Louvois, Square Louvois, (1836–1839). Louis Visconti, architect. Jean-Baptiste Klagman, sculptor.

Fontaine du Monument-aux-Morts, interior court of the Mairie, (1992), Konikovic, architect.

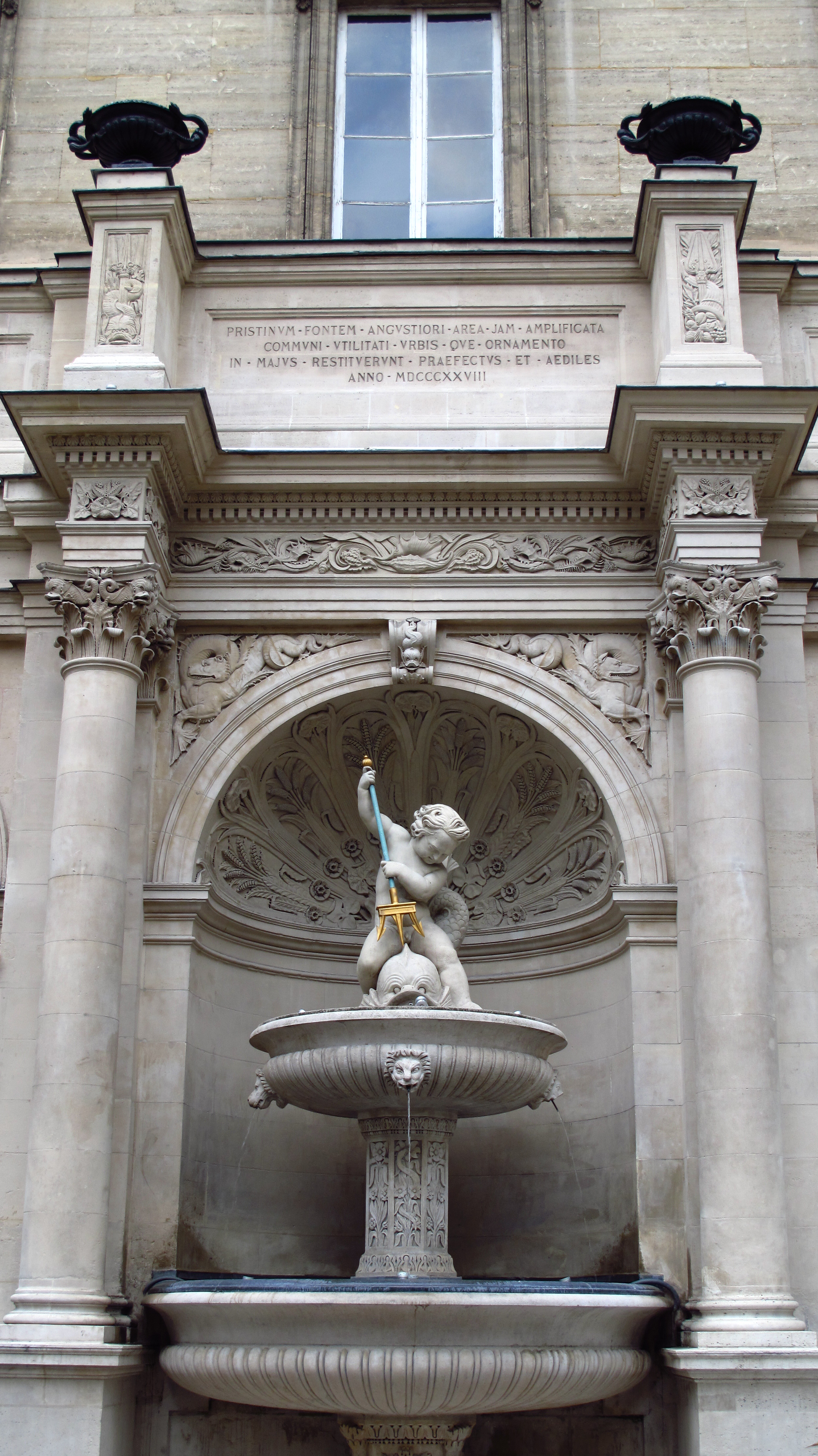
Fontaine Gaillon (1828)

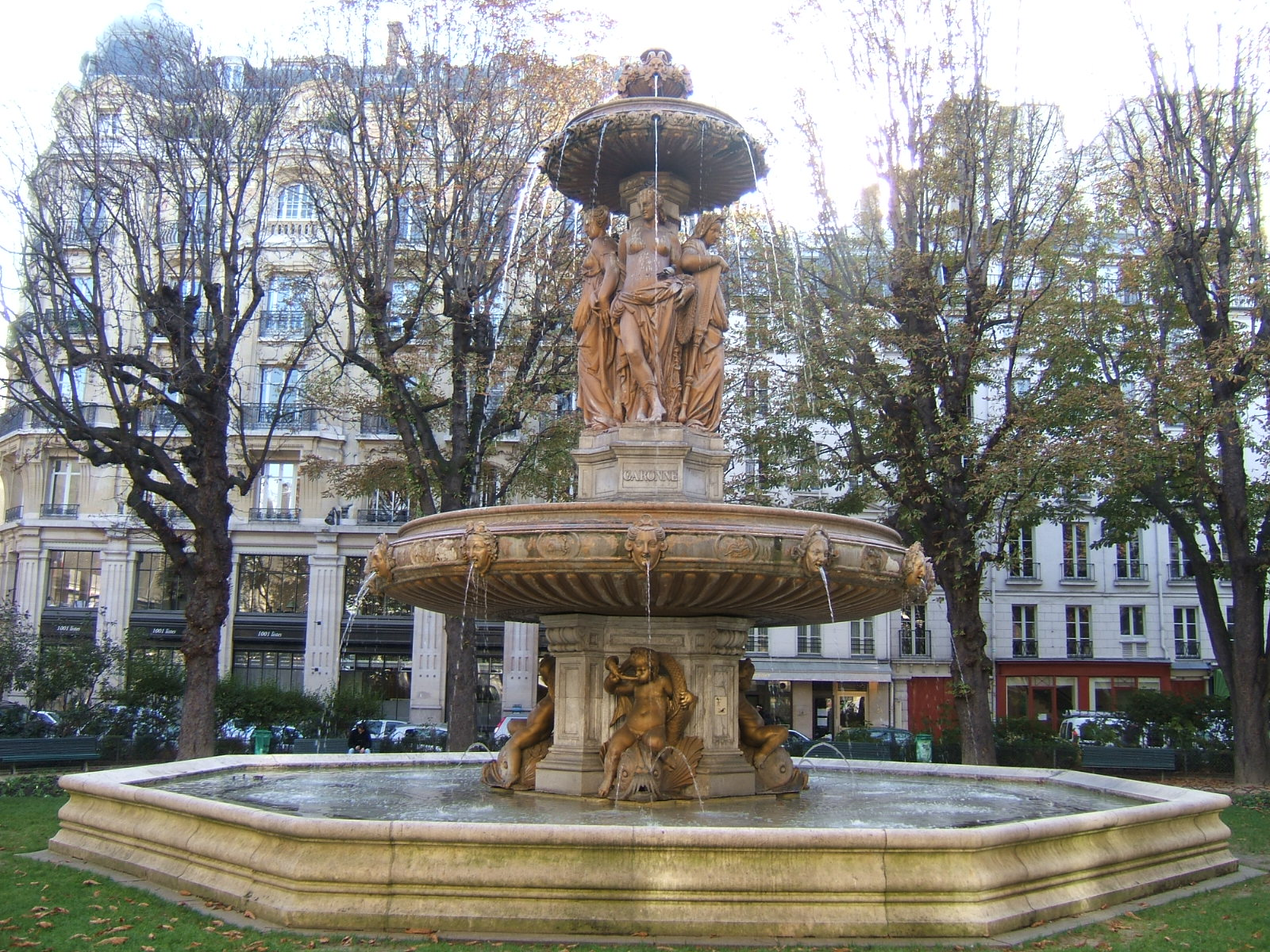
Fontaine Louvois (1844)

== 3rd arrondissement ==
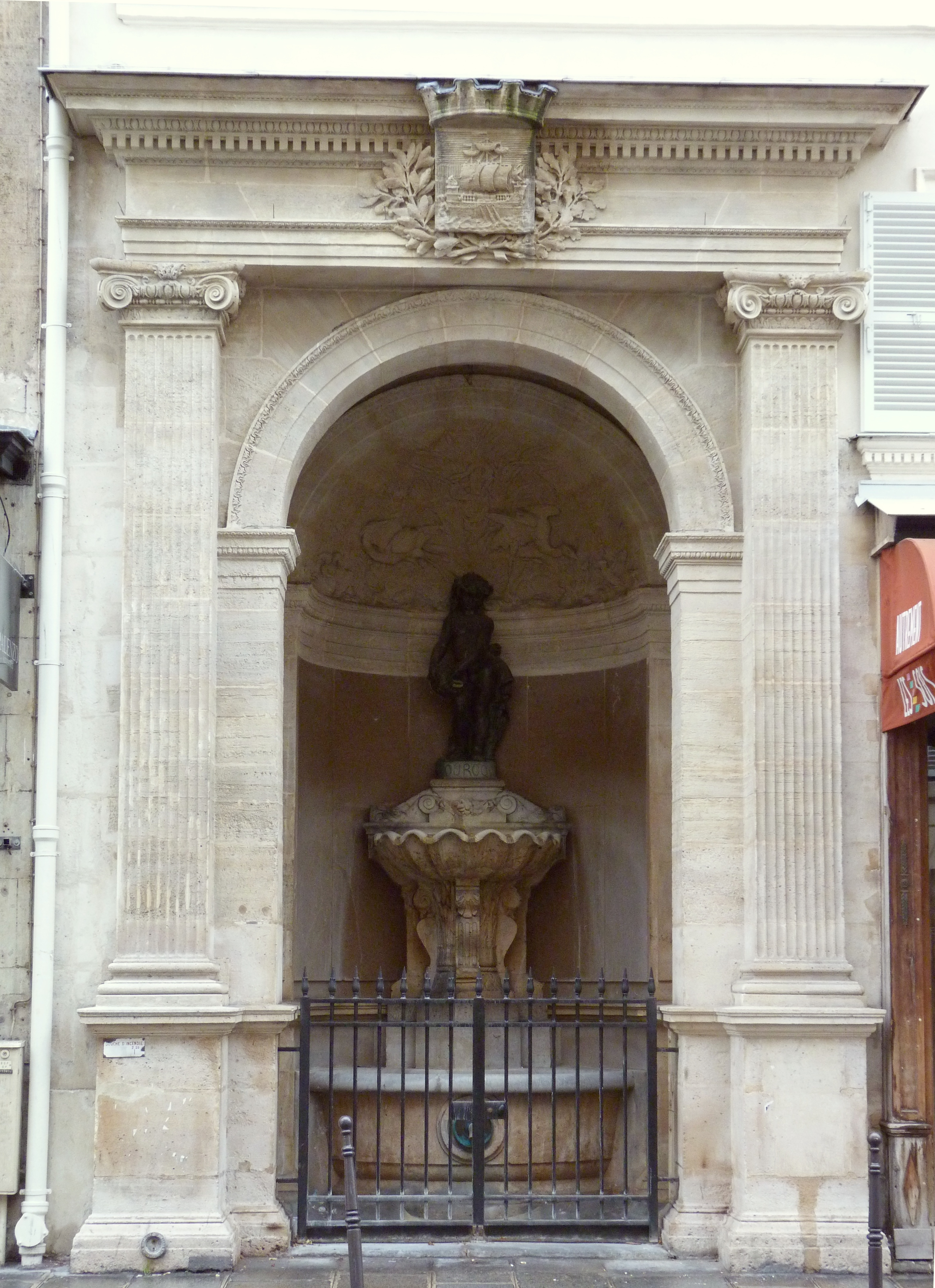
Fontaine de Joyeuse (1847)

Fontaine des-Arts-et-Metiers, Square Emile -Chautemps, 1860, Gabriel Davioud, architect, Charles-Alphonse Gumery, August-Louis Ottin and Michel Joseph Napoléon Liénard, sculptors.

Fontaine de l'Echaudé or Fontaine des Marais du Temple. At the corner of rue Vieille-du-Temple and rue du Poitou, 1624. Augustin Guillatin, architect, restored by Jean Beausire. Destroyed in 1880.

Fontaine des Haudriettes, at the corner of rue des Haudriettes and rue des Archives, built about 1636, rebuilt 1770. Moreau-Desproux, architect.

Fontaine du marché Saint-Martin. In Marché Saint Martin. built between 1811 and 1816, Antoine-Marie Peyre, architect. destroyed.

Fontaine du musée Picasso, Jardin de l'Hôtel Salé (the Picasso Museum), rue des Coutures-Saint-Gervais, 1985, Roland Simounet, architect.

Fontaine de Paradis puis du Chaume. At the corner of rue de Paradis and rue du Chaume, 1628. Augustin Guillain, architect. Rebuilt by Jean Beausire in 1705.

Fontaine Saint Louis. 41 rue de Turenne, built between 1671 and 1677, destroyed in 1843. A new fountain was built in 1847 by Isidore-Romain Boitel.

Fontaine du Temple. Rue du Temple, 1700, Jean Beausire, architect. Reconstructed during the First Empire by Louis-Simon Bralle. Later destroyed.

Fontaine du Vertbois or Saint-Martin. Rue Saint-Martin against a tower of the Convent of Saint-Martin-des-Champs, at the corner of rue du Vertbois. 1712, Jean Bullet, architect.

== 4th arrondissement ==
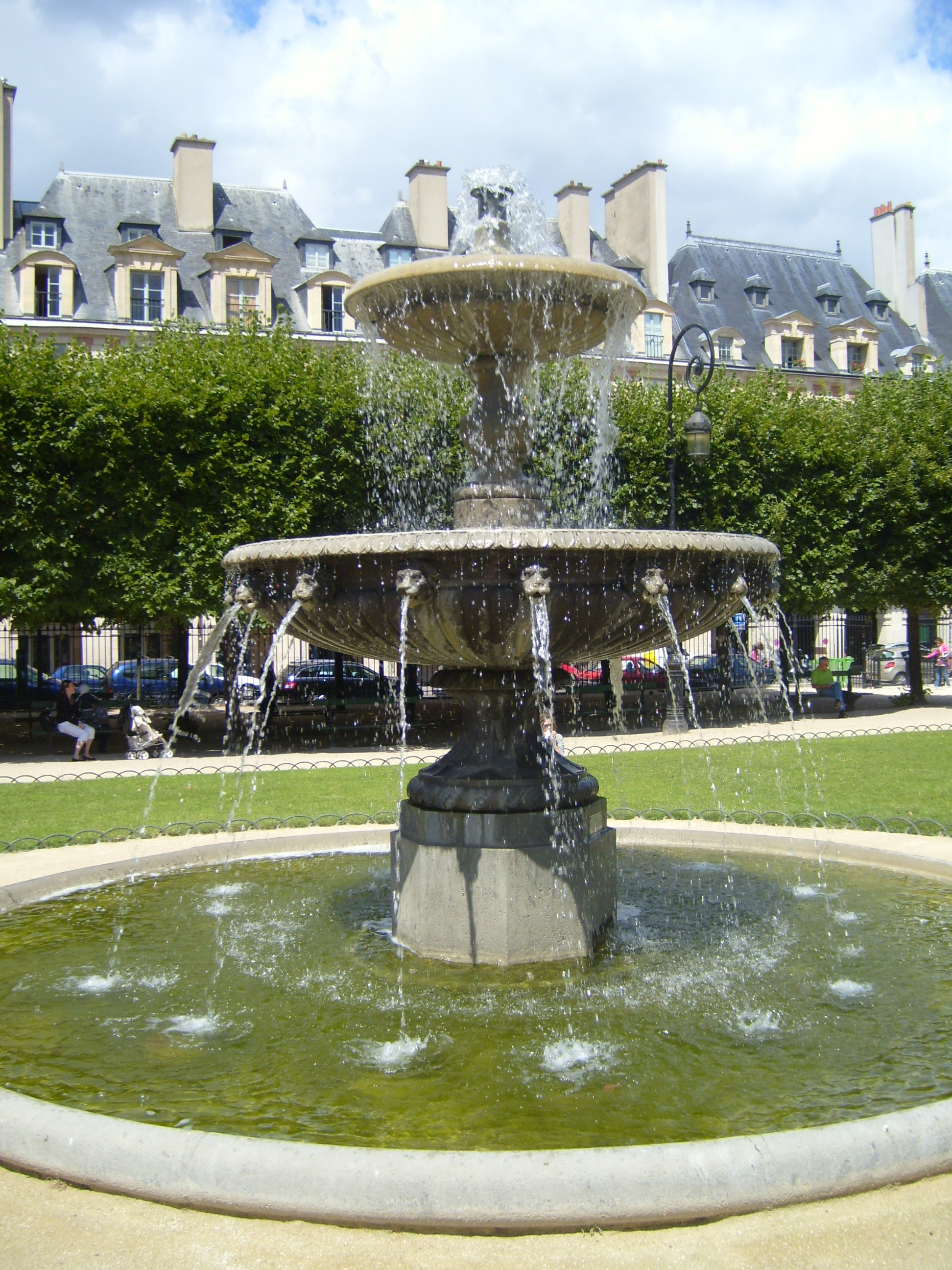
Fontaine de la Place des Vosges (1824)

Fontaine de Birague, Fontaine des Jesuites or Fontaine Sainte-Catherine. Rue de Saint-Paul-Saint-Louis. About 1579. Reconstructed in 1627 by Augustin Gullain, and in 1707 by Jean Beausire. Destroyed in 1856.

Fontaine de l'Apport-Baudoyer, Place de l'Apport Baudoyer, built 1626, Augustin Guillan, architect. Destroyed.

Fontaine de la Grève, Place de Grève. 1625. Built by Augustin Guillain, architect and Franceso Bordini, sculptor. Destroyed in 1638 and rebuilt by the same architect, then destroyed finally in 1674.

The first Fontaine du Parvis Notre-Dame. Parvis of Notre-Dame cathedral. 1625, by architect Augustin Guillain and Francesco Bordini, sculptor. Destroyed in 1638. Rebuilt by same architect, then destroyed in 1738.

Fontaine des Blancs-Manteaux or des Guillemites. Rue de Blancs-Manteaux. Originally in the wall of the Abbey, then at the corner of this street and rue des Guillemites, since 1930 in square des Blancs-Manteaux. Built in 1655, rebuilt in 1719 by Jean Beausire.

Fontaine des Tournelles, at the corner of rue des Tournelles and the square in front of the Bastille. (before 1716). Destroyed.

Fontaine du marché Saint-Jean, Place marché Saint-Jean, about 1717. Destroyed.

Fontaine Maubuée, Corner of rue Saint-Martin and rue Maubuée, 1733, by Jean-Baptiste Beausire. Moved in 1937 to the corner of the rue Saint-Martin and the rue de Venise.

Second Fontaines du Parvis Notre-Dame, Parvis of Notre-Dame cathedral, 1806. Louis-Simone Bralle, architect, and Augustin Félix Fortin, sculptor. The fountains were destroyed, but the vases are preserved at the Hôpital Lariboisière.

Fontaine du marché au Fleurs, marché au Fleurs, quai Desaix, 1809. Molinos, architect. Destroyed.

Fontaine de la rue des Vielles-Garnisons, Rue de la Tixeranderie, at the corner of Vielles-Garnisons. Built during the First Empire. Louis-Simone Bralle, architect. Destroyed.

Fontaine du marché des Blancs-Manteaux. 8 rue des Hospitalières-Saint-Gervais. about 1819. Edme Gaulle, sculptor.

Fontaines de la place des Vosges. First fountains in 1811 by Girard, replaced in 1824. Jean-François Ménager, architect.

Fontaine de la rue des Lions-Saint-Paul. Built during the First Empire by Louis Simone Bralle. Destroyed about 1840.

Fontaine Charlemagne, 8 rue Charlemagne, 1840.

Fontaine de l'Archêveché, Square Jean-XXIII, 1843–45. Alphonse Vigoureux, architect. Louis-Parfait Merlieux. sculptor. Restored in 1901-02 and 1954.

Fontaine de la bibliothèque Forney, Jardin de l'Hôtel de Sens, rue des Nonnains d'Hyères, 1957.

Fontaine Saint-Merri, 16 rue de Renard, 1977.'

Fontaine de l'Hôtel de Ville, Place de la Hôtel de Ville, 1983, François-Xavier Lalanne, sculptor

Stravinsky Fountain, Place Igor Stravinsky, 1983, Jean Tinguely and Niki de Saint-Phalle, sculptors

Fontaine de la Reynie, Place Edmond-Michelet, 1989.

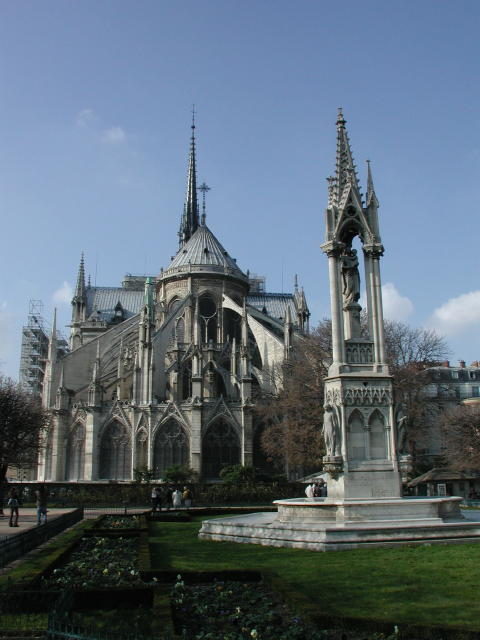
Fontaine de l'Archvêché, Square Jean-XXIII, (1843–45)

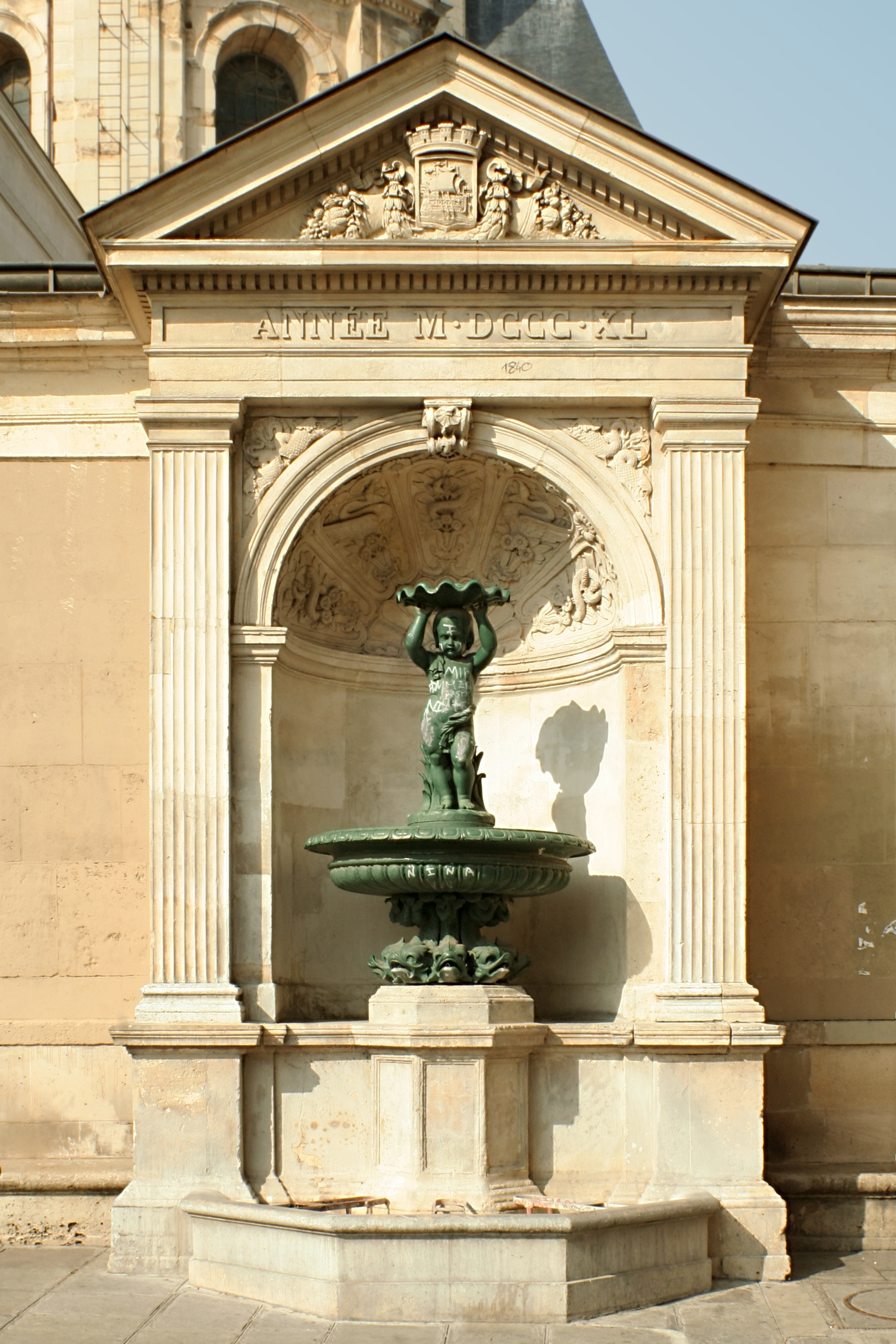
Fontaine rue Charlemagne, (1840)

== 5th arrondissement ==
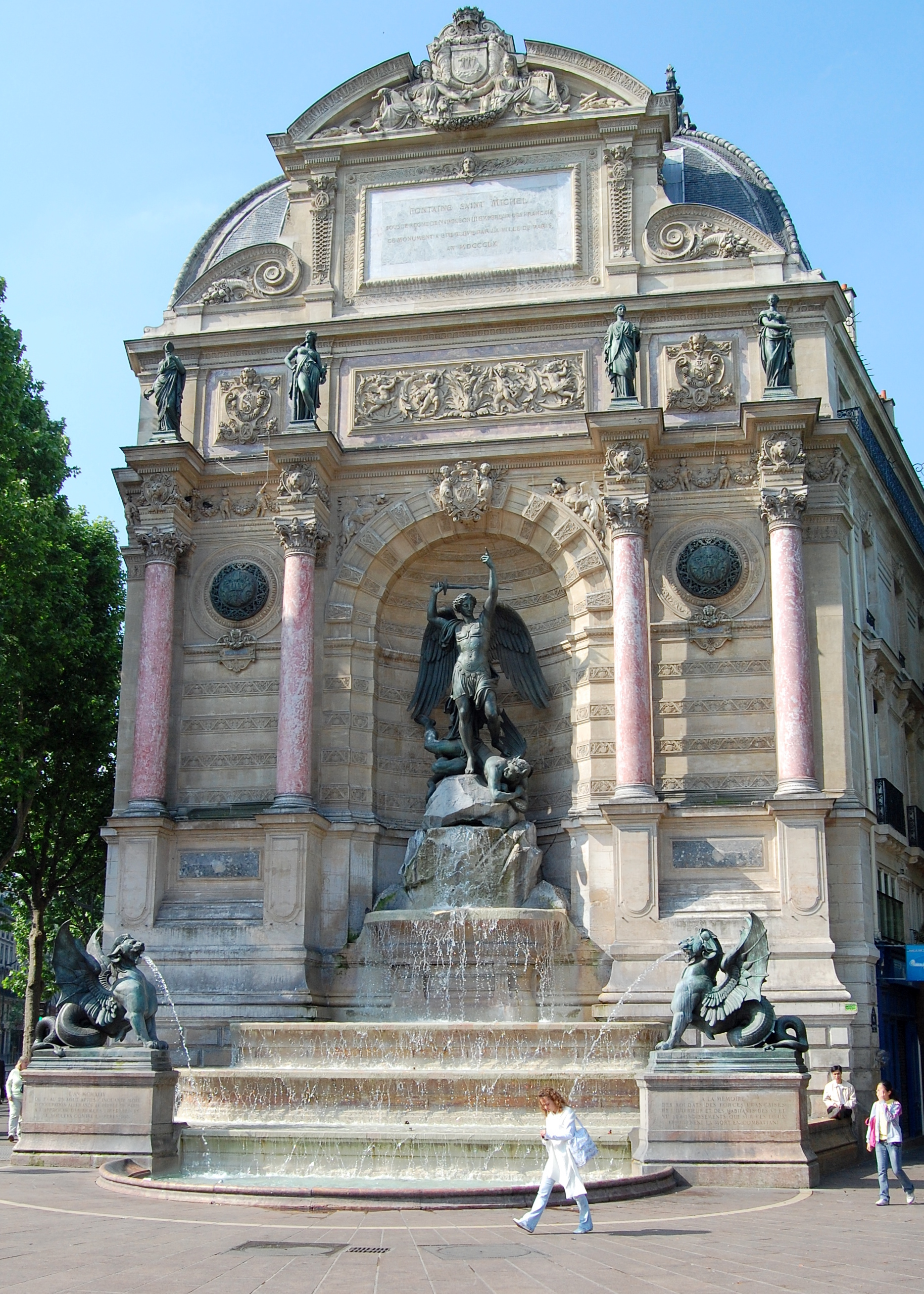
Fontaine Saint-Michel, Place Saint-Michel, (1858–60).

Fontaine des barnabites, later called Fontaine Saint-Victor. Originally at the corner of rue Barillerie and rue de Vieille Draperie, in front of the palace on the Ile-de-la cité, 1606. Designed by Matthieu Jacques. Moved to the crossroads in front of the Abbey of Saint-Victor in 1664. Destroyed in about 1852.

Fontaine Saint-Benoit, Place Cambrai. near rue Saint-Jacques, 1623. architect, Augustin Guillain. sculptor, Pierre Bernard. Destroyed.

Fontaine de la Montagne Saint-Geneviéve, Rue de la Montagne Saint-Geneviéve, 1623. Augusin Guillain, architect and Pierre Bernard, sculptor. Destroyed.

Fontaine Maubert or Fontaine des Carmes, Rue Maubert, 1623. Augustin Guillain, architect, Pierre Bernard, sculptor. Destroyed.

Fontaine du Pot-de-Fer. 1671. At the corner of rue de Pot-de-Fer and rue Mouffetard. Michel Noblet, architect.

Fontaine Saint Séverin, at the corner of rue Saint Séverin and rue Saint-Jacques. 1625. Augustin Guillain, sculptor. Reconstructed identical to the original by Jean Beausire in 1685. (As of May 2011, disappeared)

Fontaine de la Porte Saint-Michel, rue de la Harpe, 1684. Terrade, architect. Destroyed.

Fontaine de l'Abbaye de Saint-Germain-des-Prés, or Fontaine Childebert. Originally at the corner of rue Childebert and rue Sainte-Marguerite, (1715–1717), by architects Victor-Thierry Dailly and Jean Beausire. Dismantled to make way for Boulevard Saint-Germain and moved to square Langevin, against the wall of the former Ecole Polytechnique.

Fontaine de la place Maubert, Place Maubert. First Empire. Jean Rondolet, architect. Destroyed.

Fontaine du marché aux Chevaux or de Poliveau, Rue du Jardin-des-Plantes, 1806. Louis-Simon Bralle, architect, and Pierre-Nicolas Beauvallet, sculptor.

Fontaine Saint-Michel, Place Saint-Michel, 1858–60.

Fontaine des Carmélites, or Fontaine Notre-Dame-Des-Champs, at the corner of Rue Saint-Jacques and the impasse des Carmélites. 1625. Augustin Guillain, sculptor. Destroyed about 1853.

Fontaine de la Rue Censier, Rue Censier, at the corner of Rue Mouffetard. 1806. Architect, Louis-Simone Bralle, sculptor, Valois. Destroyed in 1866/1867.

Fontaine Cuvier, corner of rue Cuvier and rue Linné, 1840–46. Alphonse Vigoureaux, architect, Jean-Jacques Feuchere and René-Jules Pomateau, sculptors.

Fontaine Octave Gérard, Square Painlevé, 1909. Jules Chaplain, sculptor.

Fontaine Mauresque, Place du Puit-de-l'Hermite. 1929. Louis Azema, architect.

Fontaine Capitan, Rue des Arenes, 1924.

Fontaine de la Guérison, Fontaine Pelletier et Caventou, Place Louis-Martin, 1951, Pierre Poisson, sculptor.

Fontaine de la Sorbonne, Place de la Sorbonne, 1980,

Fontaine Lucien-Herr, Place Alphonse-Laveran, 1995. Bernadette Gourrier, sculptor.

Fontaine Buffon-Poliveau, rue Geoffroy-Saint-Hilaire, 1983

Fontaine de la Spirale, 11-19 rue Descartes, 1986, Denis Sloan, architect and Meret Oppenheim, sculptor.

Fontaine de Contrescarpe, Place de Contrescarpe, 1992.

Fontaine de l'Estrapade, Place de l'Estrapade, 1992.

Fontaine Hydrorrhage, Museum de la sculpture en Plein air, jardin Tino Rossi, quai Saint-Bernard, (1975–77), Daniel Badani, architect and Jean-Robert Iposteguy, sculptor.

Fontaines Laveran, Place Alphonse-Laveran, (1982), Bernadette Gourier, sculptor.

Fontaine Jussieu, La Bouche de la Vérité, Place Jussieu, (1993–94), Guy Larrigue, sculptor

Fontaine Mouffetard-Bazeilles, Pluie, Place Saint-Médard, (1990), Guy Larrigue, architect.

Fontaine Saint-Julien-l'hospitalier, Square Viviani, (1995), Georges Jeanclos, sculptor

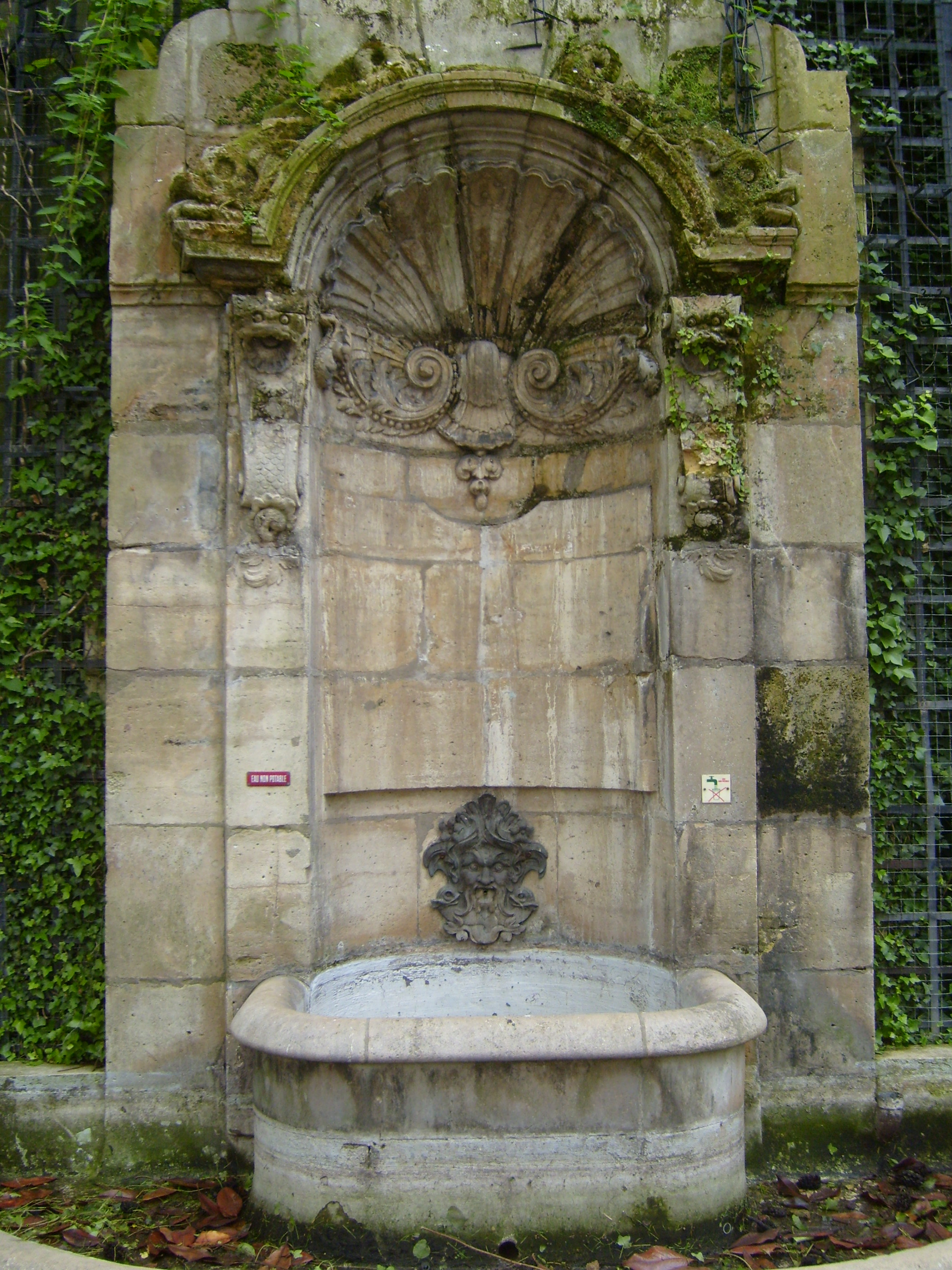
Fontaine de L'Abbaye de Saint-Germain-des-Pres, (1714–1717). It was moved in the 19th century to make room for the Boulevard Saint-Germain, and now is in Square Langevin, in the 5th arrondissement.

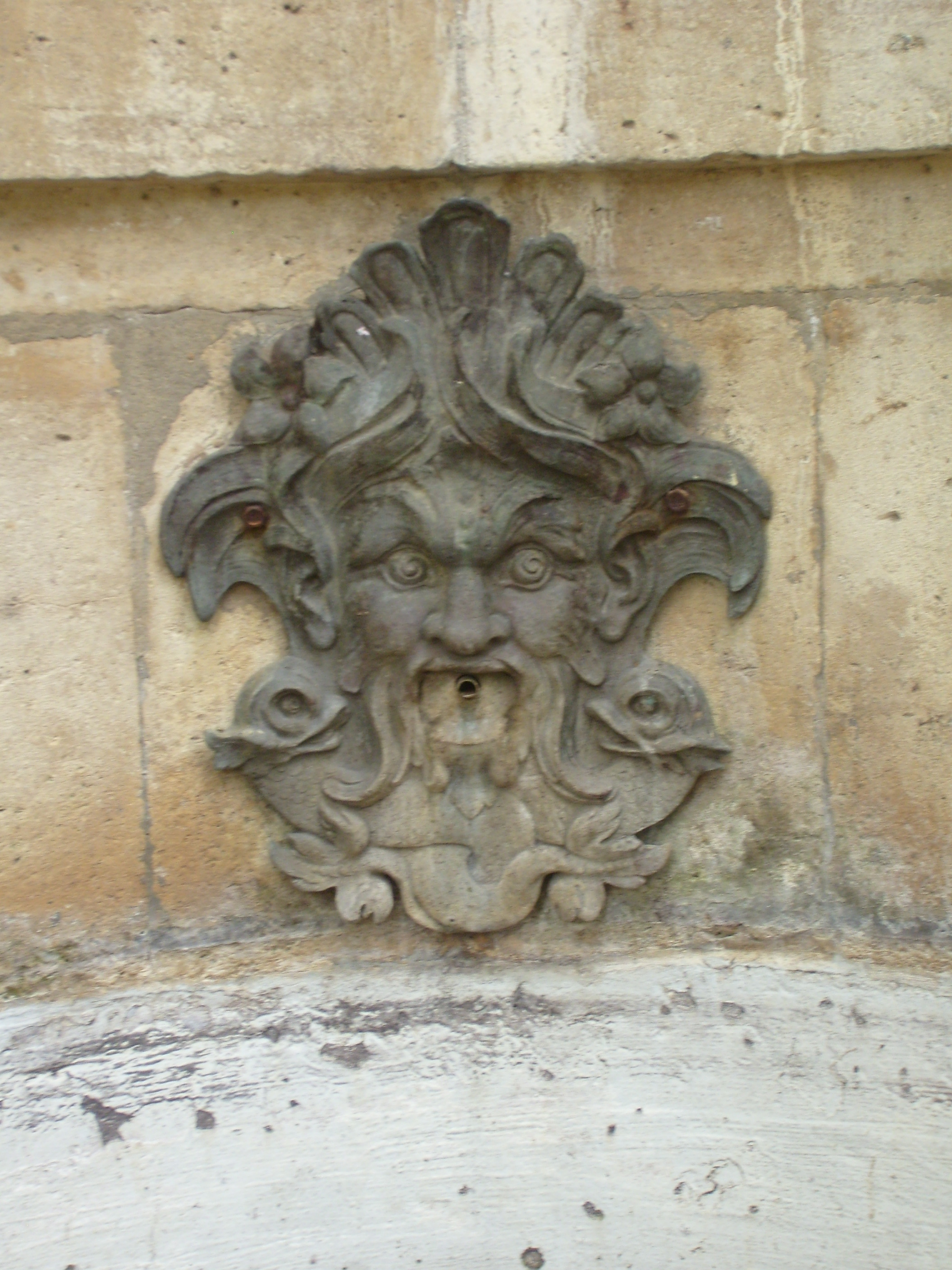
Masqueron of the Fontaine de l'Abbaye de Saint-Germain-des-Pres (1714–1717)

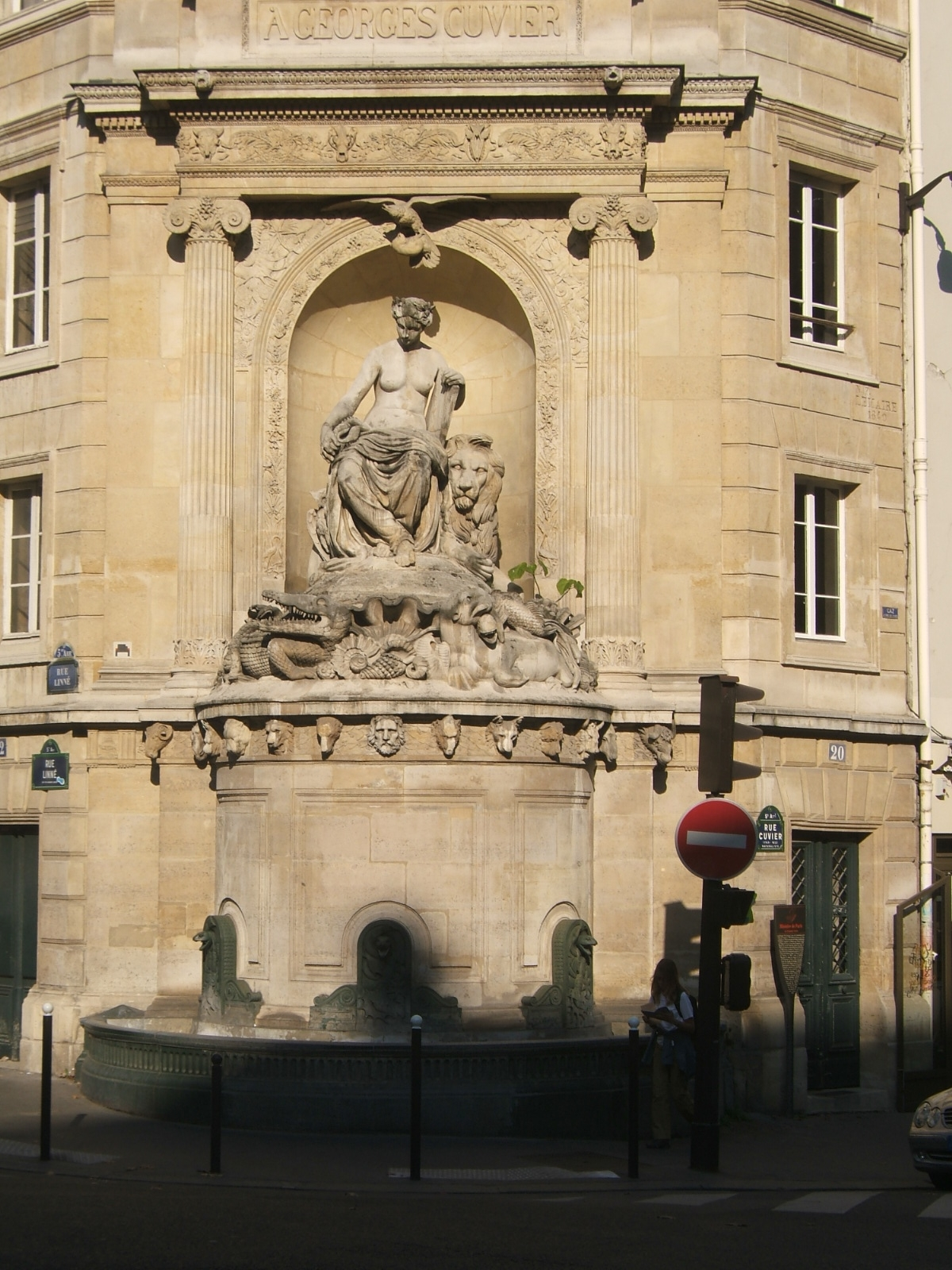
Fontaine Cuvier (1840–1846)

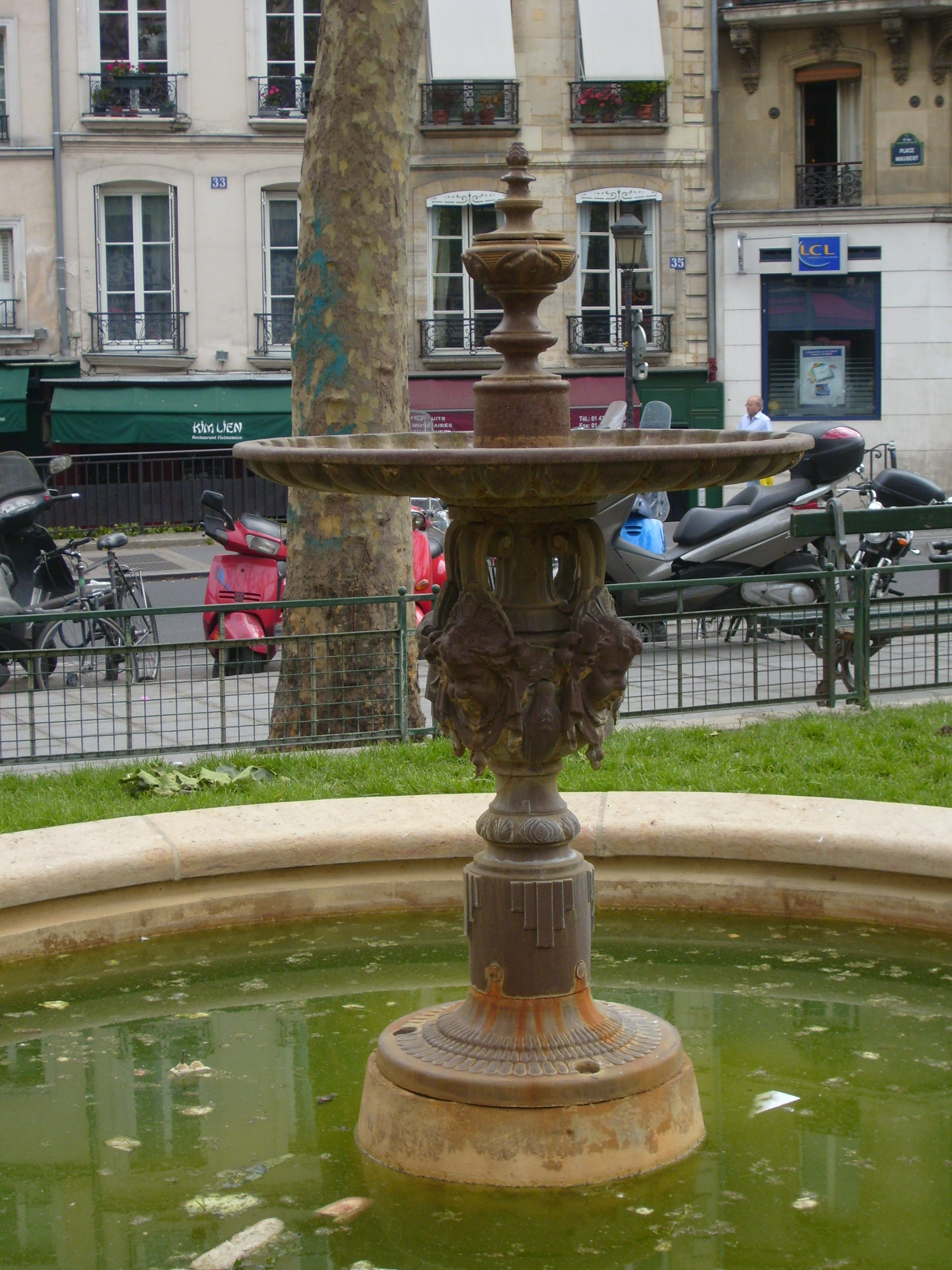
Fontaine de la Place Maubert (date unknown, probably 19th century)

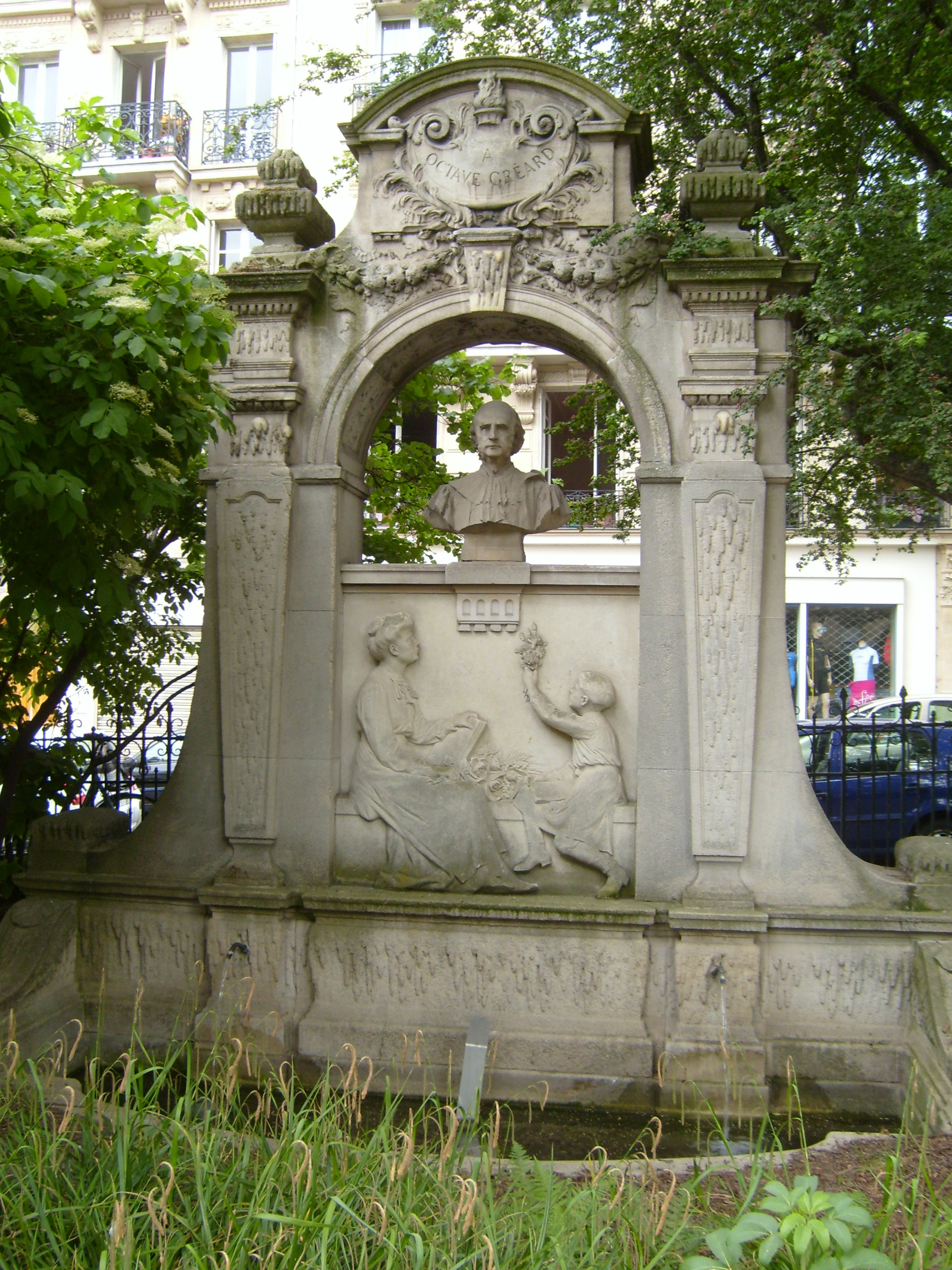
Fontaine Octave Gérard, Square Painlevé, (1909.)

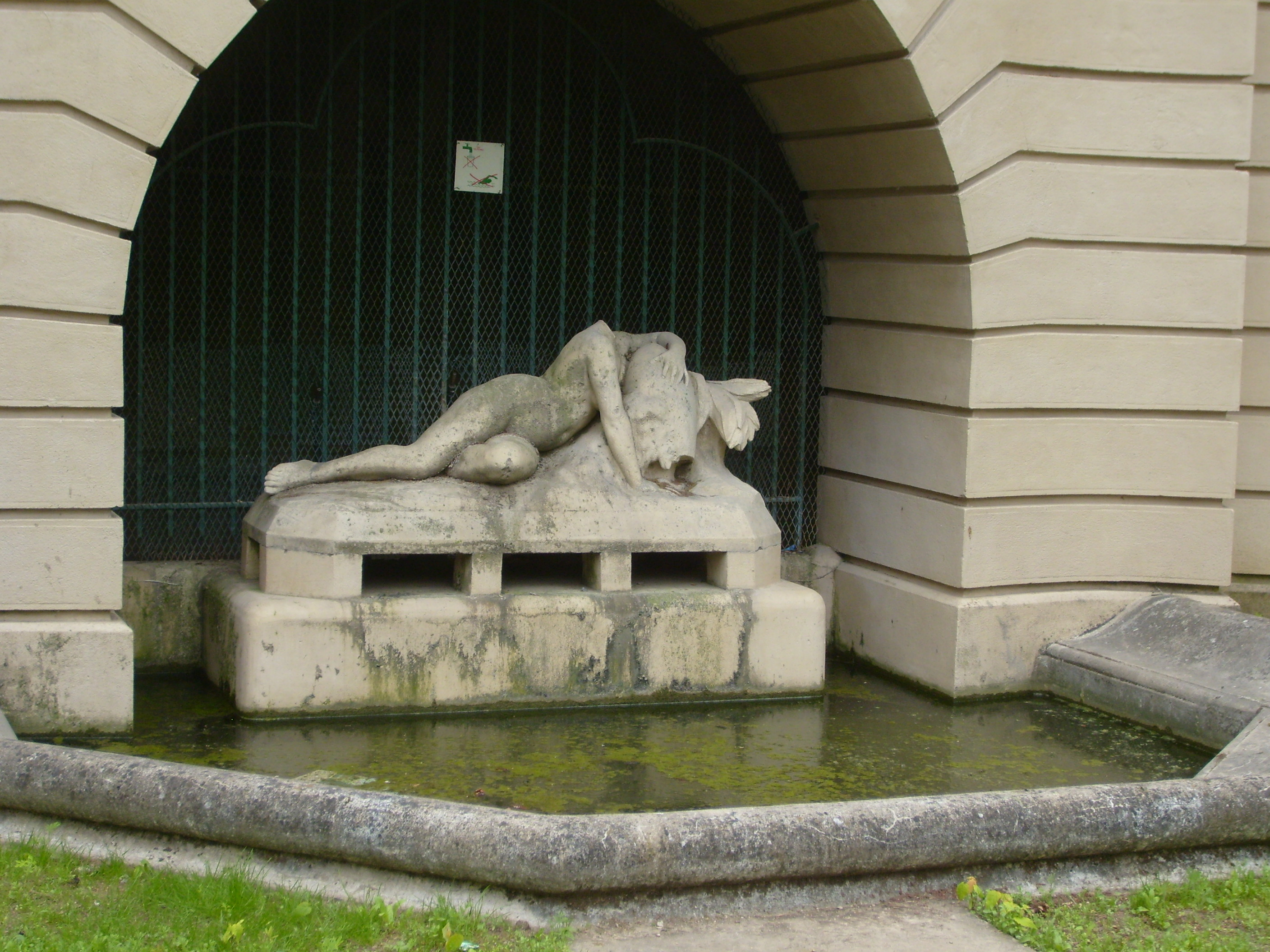
Fontaine Capitan, rue des Arenes, (1924)

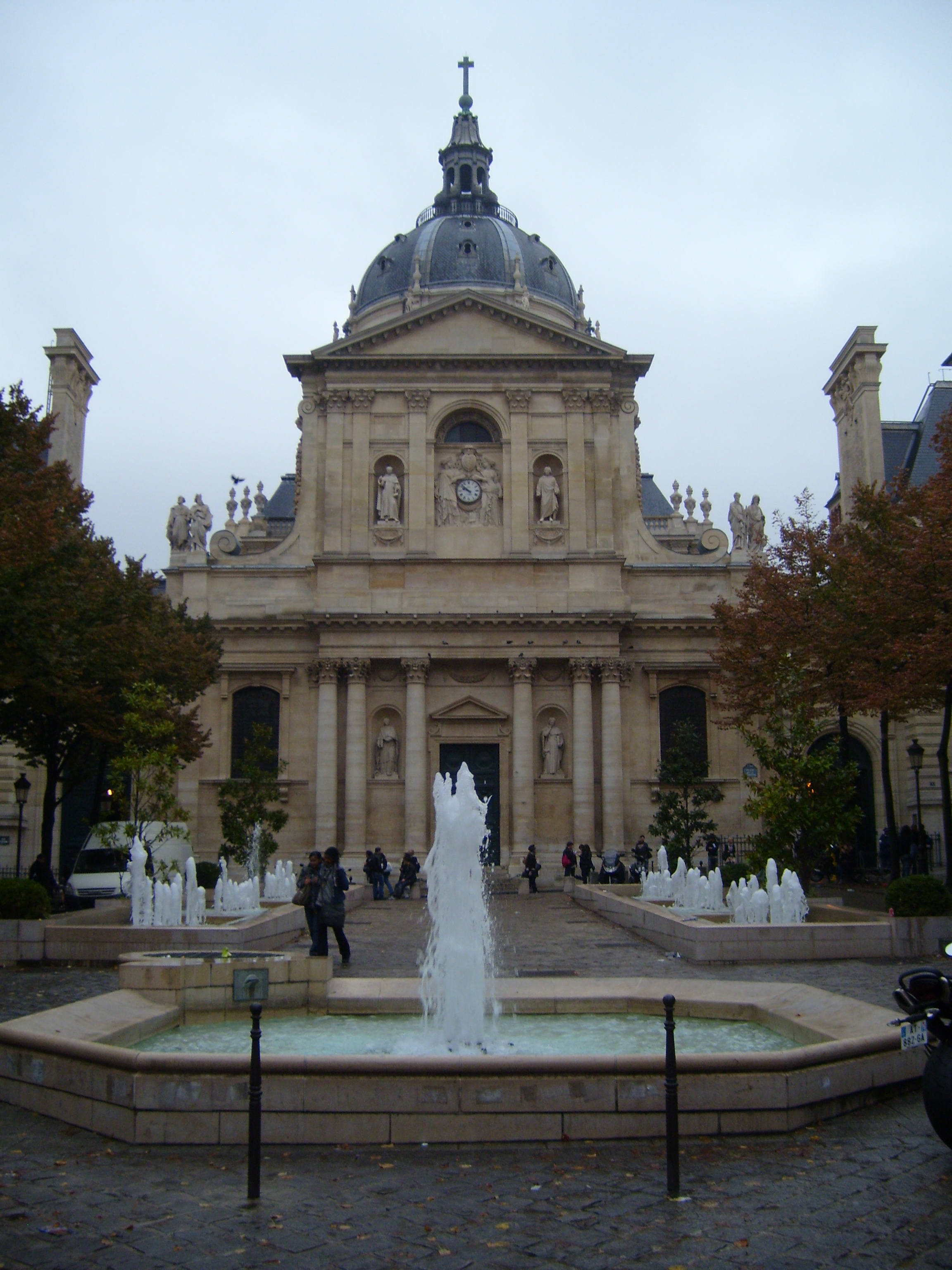
Fountain Place de La Sorbonne (1980)

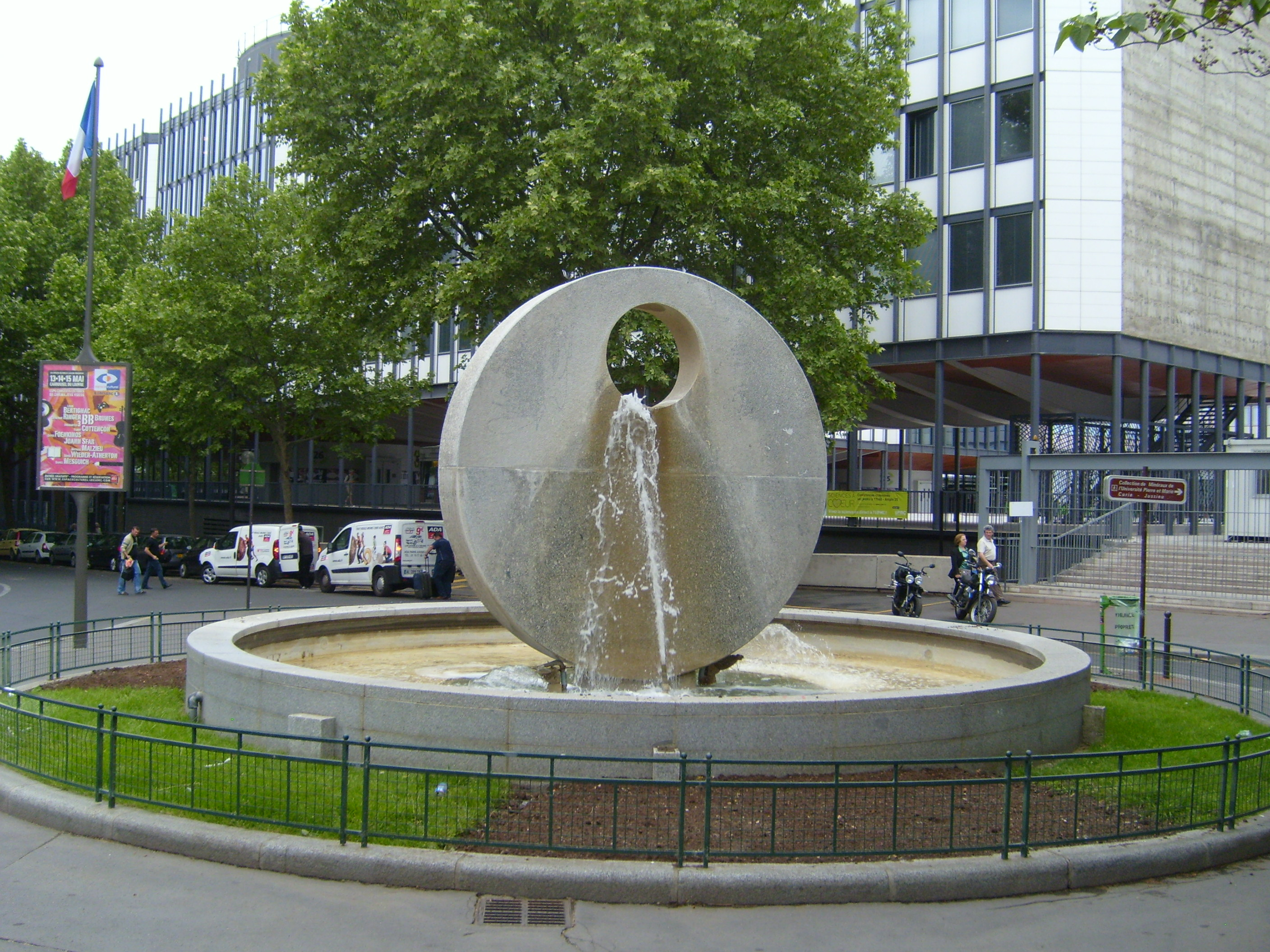
Fontaine Jussieu, Place Jussieu (1993–94)

== 6th arrondissement ==
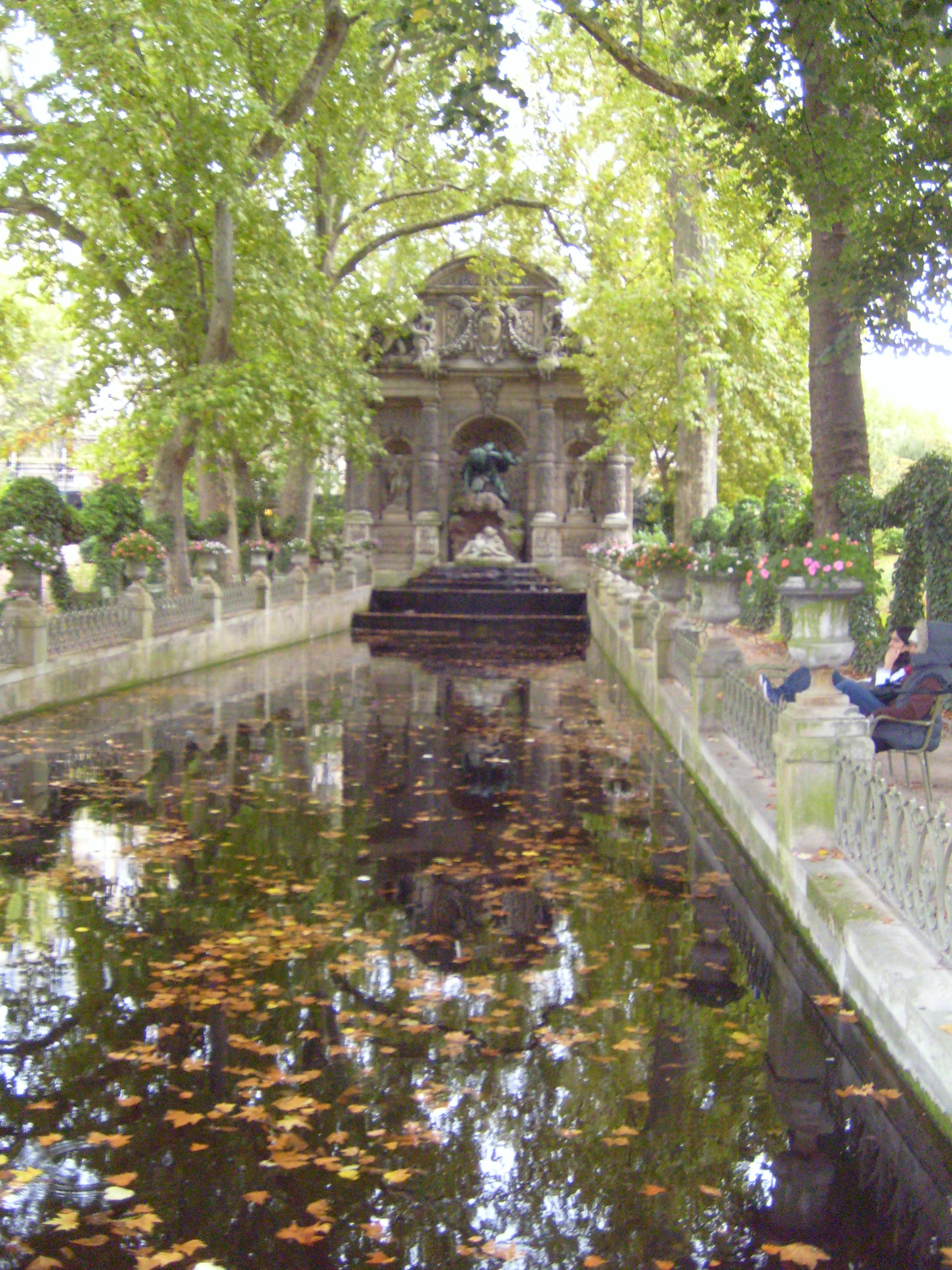
Medici Fountain (1630)

Fontaine Saint-Côme. At the corner of the rue de Codeliers and rue de la Harpe. 16th century. Rebuilt by Jean Beausire against the wall of the church of Saint-Côme-Saint-Damien. Later destroyed.

Medici Fountain, Luxembourg Gardens, about 1630. Attributed to Salomon de Brosse but more probably by Tommaso Francini, architect. Moved thirty meters to make room for new boulevard and rebuilt in 1864.

Fontaine de la Charité, Rue Taranne, between 1671 and 1677. Destroyed.

Fontaine Palatine or Fontaine Garancière, rue Garancière. 1715.

Fontaine des Cordeliers, Rue des Cordeliers, about 1717. Probably by Jean Beausire, architect. Destroyed at the end of the 19th century.

Fontaine de Léda, 1806–09, Originally corner of rue du Regard, moved 1858 and placed behind the Medici Fountain in Luxembourg Gardens.

Fontaine de la place de l'Ecole-de-Médicine, 1803–1807. Jacques Gondoin, architect. Destroyed 1835.

Fontaine du Palais des Beaux-Arts, or Fontaine de l'Institut. 1806–1810. Léon Vaudoyer, sculptor. The fountain was taken out of service in 1865. The lions that decorated the fountain were moved in 1950 to the square between rue-6-juin-1944 and rue-du-25-aout-1944 in Boulogne-Billancourt, where they can be seen today.

Fontaine du marché des Carmes, originally in the marché des Carmes, now in Square Gabriel-Pierné, (1819). Alexandre-Evariste Fragonard, sculptor.

Fontaine de la Paix. Allée du Séminaire, originally at the marché Saint-Germain, moved in 1821 to Place Saint Sulpice, moved to present location in 1935. Detournelle, architect, and Caraffe, Voinier, Jean-Joseph Espercieux, Marquis, sculptors.

Fontaine des Orateurs Sacrés or Fontaine Saint-Sulpice. Place Saint-Sulpice. 1843–1848. Louis Visconti, architect.

Fontaine de l'Observatoire, Jardin de l'Observatoire, 1867–74. Gabriel Davioud, architect, Jean-Baptiste Carpeaux, principal sculptor.

Bassin Soufflot, or bassin de la place Edmond Rostand. 1862–63. Place Edmond Rostande. Gabriel Davioud, architect. Sculptural group added to fountain in 1884. Gustave Crauck, sculptor.

Fontaine de Eugène Delacroix, Luxembourg Gardens, 19th century, architect unknown.

Fontaine Pastoral, Square Saint-Germain-des-Prés, square Felix Desruelles. 1914. Ollivier, architect. Felix Desruelles, sculptor.

Fontaine Jacob, 2 rue Jacob, 1978, Guy Larrigue, sculptor.

Fontaine Littré, 4 rue Littré 1983, Shamaï Haber, sculptor (disappeared)

Fontaine du Québec, Embâcle, Place du Québec, 1984, Alfred Gindre, architect and Charles Daudelin, sculptor.

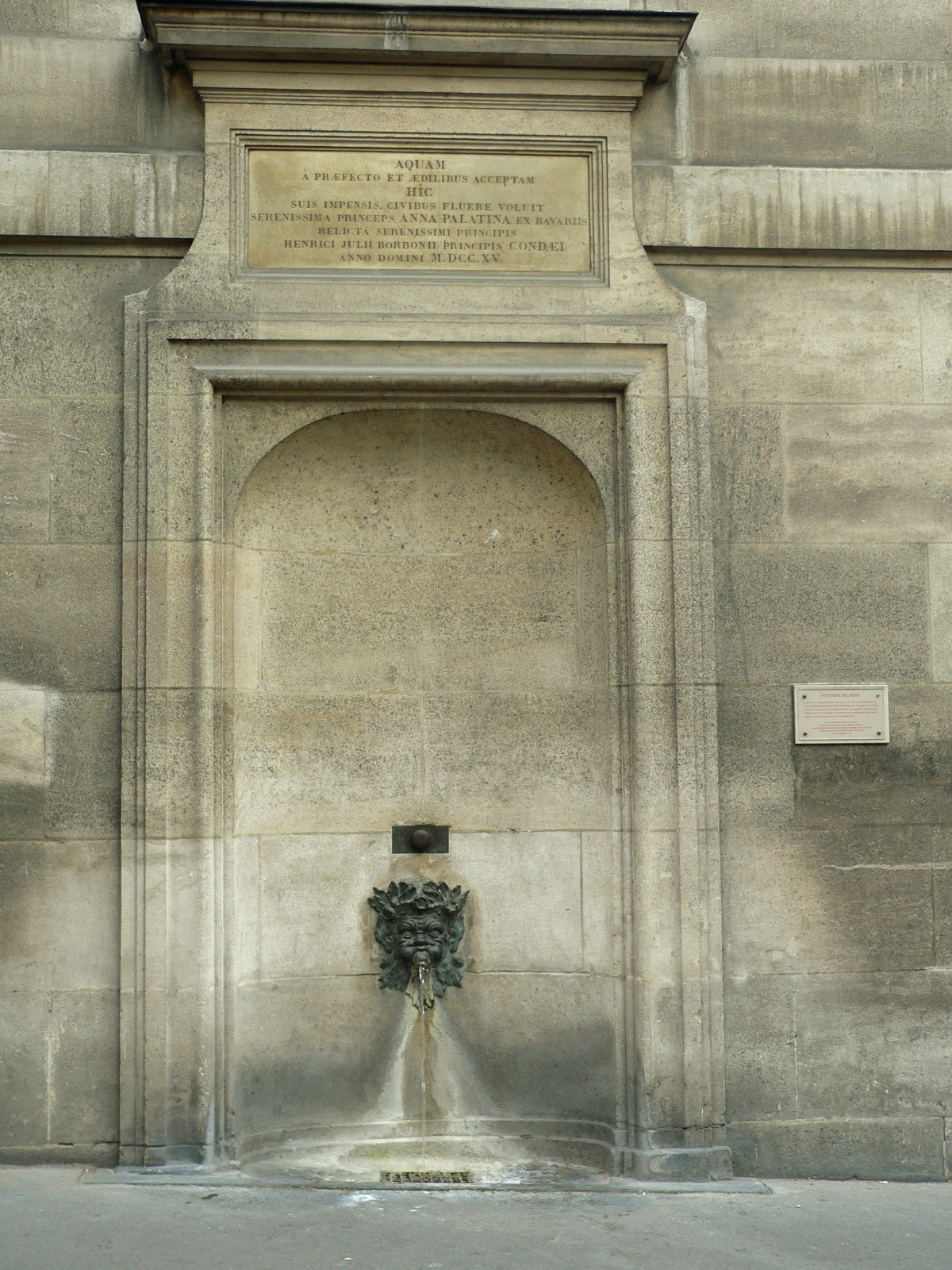
Fontaine Palatine, 12 rue Garancière (1715)

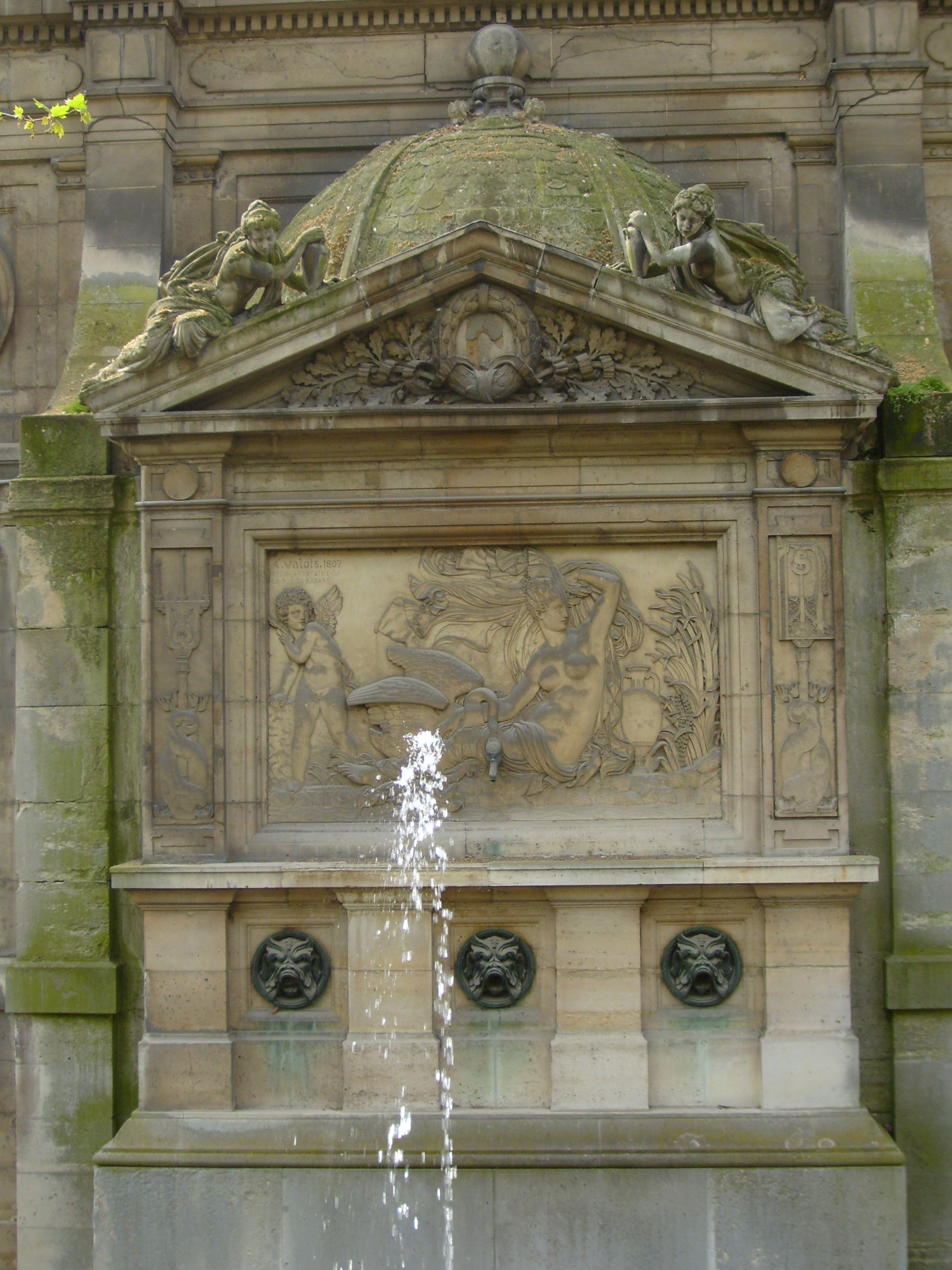
Fontaine de Léda, {1806–09}, behind the Medici Fountain in Luxembourg Gardens.

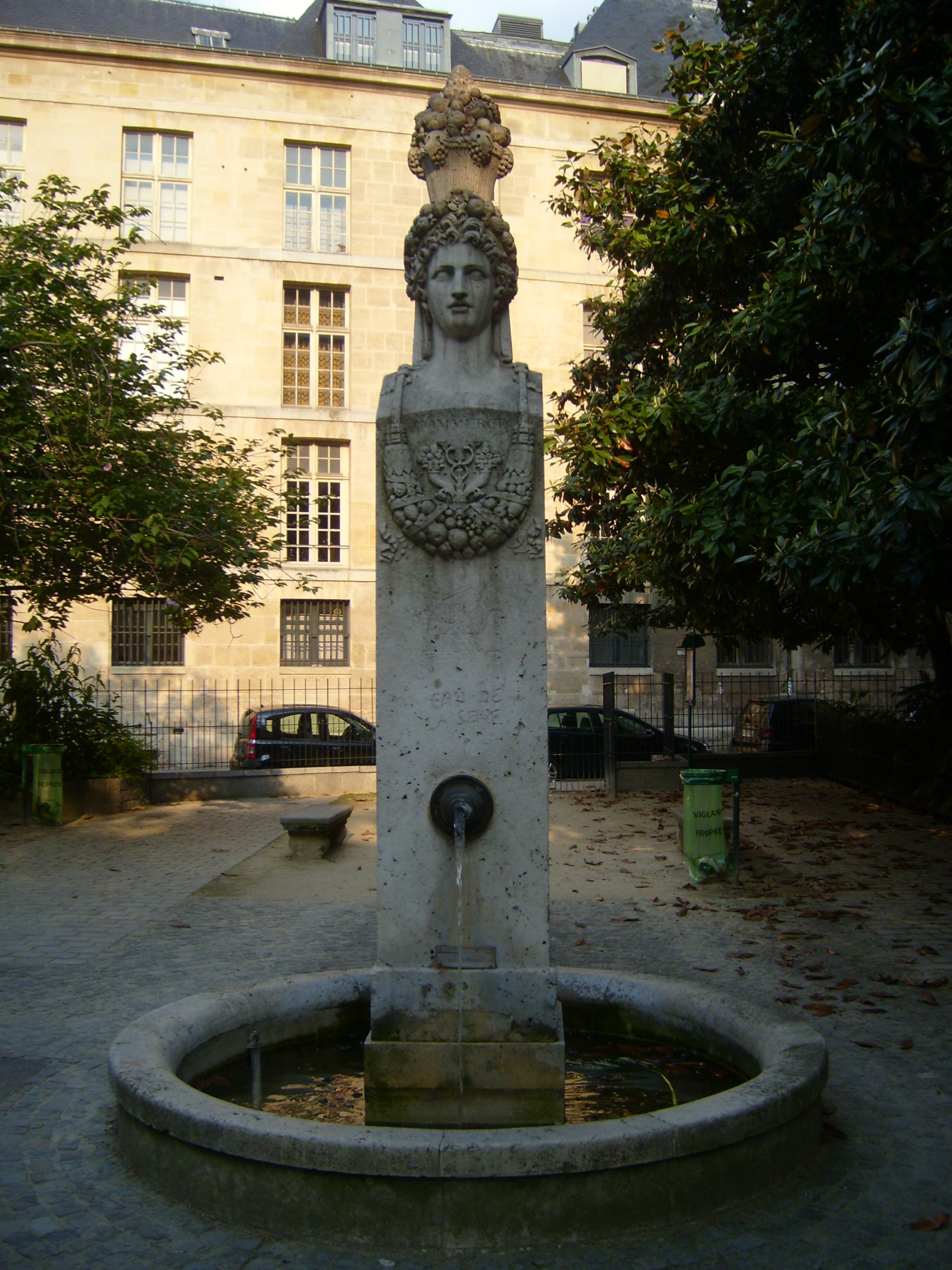
Fontaine du marché des Carmes, Square Gabriel-Pierné, (1819). ( 6th arrondissement).

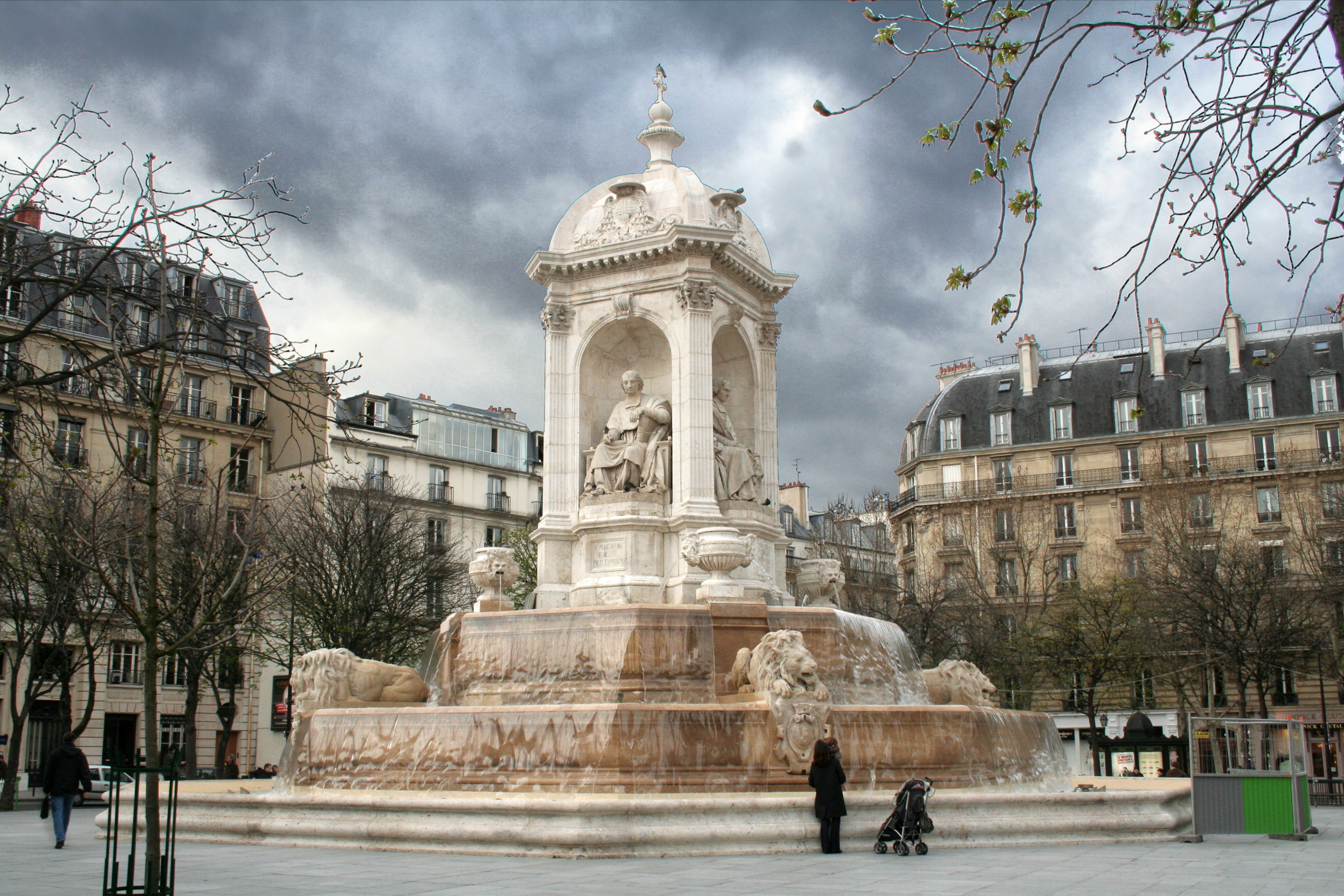
Fontaine Saint-Sulpice, Place Saint-Sulpice, (1843–48)

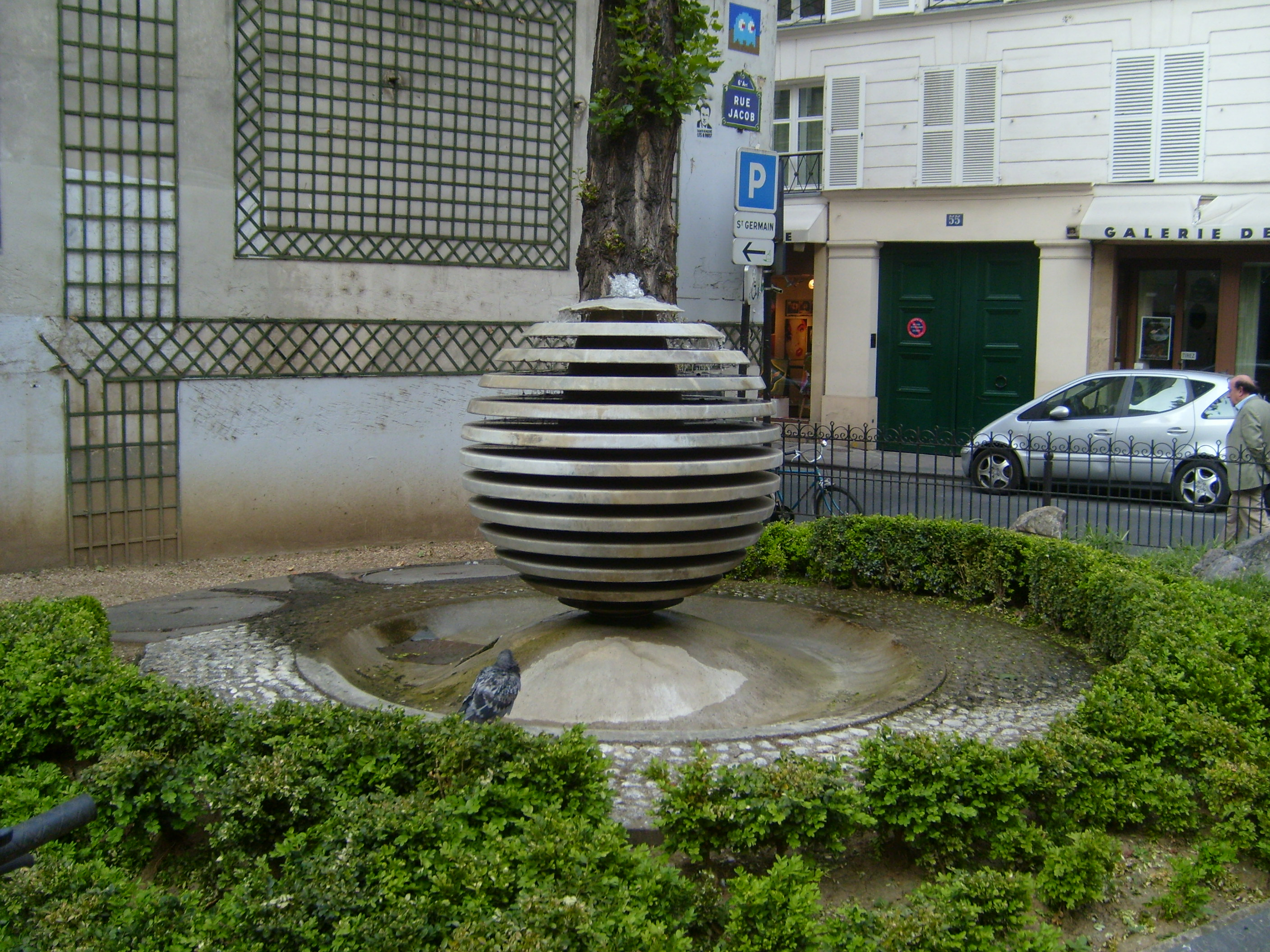
Fontaine Jacob, 2 rue Jacob, (1978)

== 7th arrondissement ==
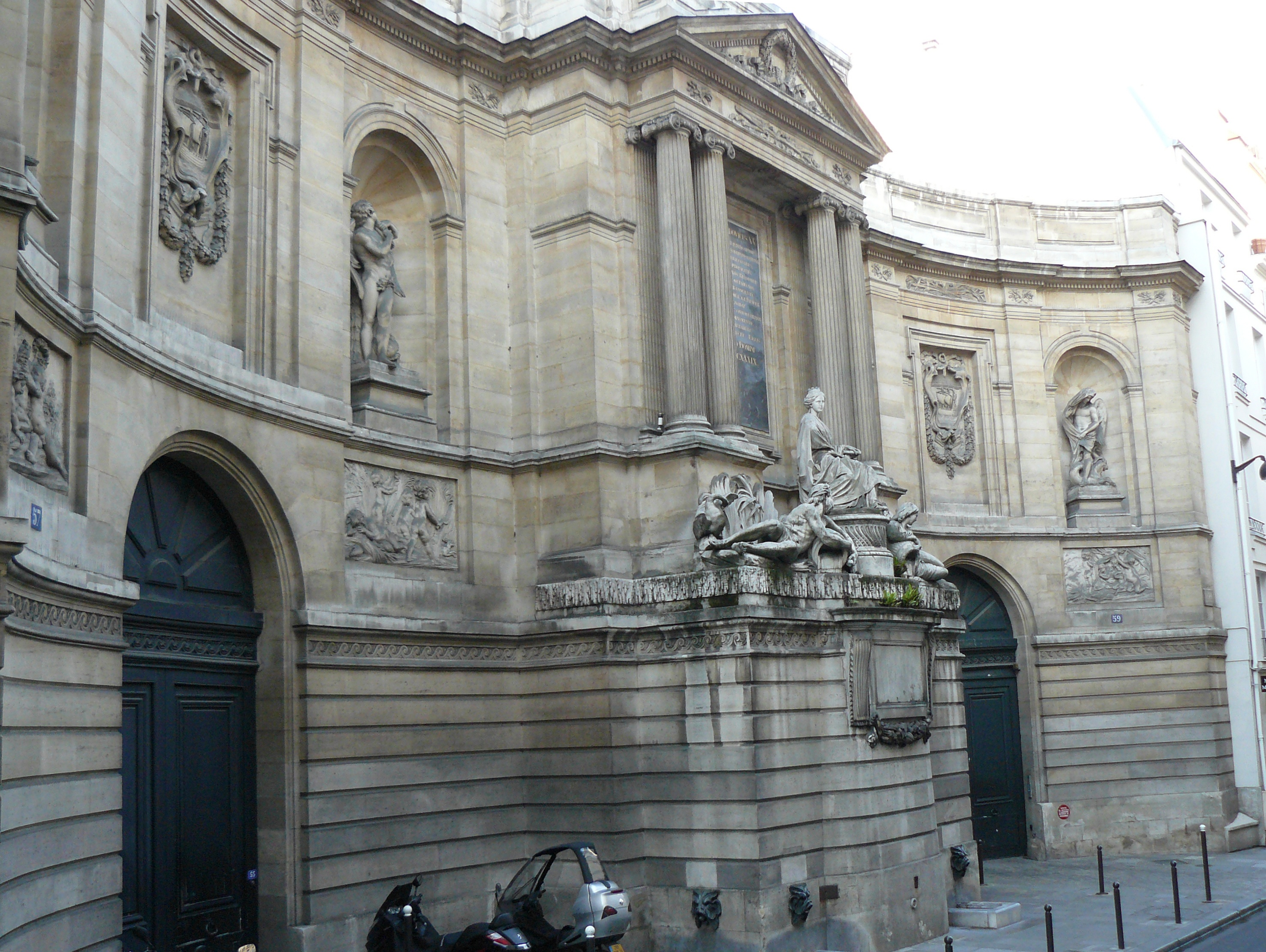
Fontaine des Quatre-Saisons 1739, (7th arrondissement)

Fontaine des Quatre-Saisons or Fontaine de Grenelle. 57-59 rue de Grenelle, 1739. Edme Bouchardon, architect and sculptor.

Fontaine de l'esplanade des Invalides, or Fontaine du Lion de Saint-Marc. Esplanade des Invalides, 1800–1804. Charles Percier and August Fontaine, architects, and T Trepat and Chauvet, sculptors. The fountain was originally built to display the lion from Piazza San Marco in Venice, brought to Paris by Napoleon Bonaparte. The statue was removed in 1815 after Napoleon's defeat at Waterloo, and the pedestal was destroyed in 1840.

Fontaine de la place de La Madeleine, Square Santiago-du-Chili. and place Francois-Ier (8th arrondissement), 1864–65. originally in the place de La Madeleine. Gabriel Davioud, architect and Francois-Theophile Murget, sculptor. Moved to its present location near the Hotel des Invalides in 1902.

Fontaine du Fellah, or Egyptian Fountain. 42 Rue de Sèvres, 1806–1808. Louis-Simon Bralle, architect, Pierre-Nicolas Beauvallet, sculptor. The original statue was replaced by another by Gechter in 1844.

Fontaine du Gros-Caillou, or Fontaine de Mars. 129-131 rue Saint-Dominique, 1806. Louis-Simon Bralle, architect, Pierre-Nicolas Beauvallet, sculptor.

Bassins of Place du Maréchal-Joffre, 1958, Creusot, architect.

Fontaine de l"Intendant, Jardin de l'Intendant, boulevard de La Tour Maubourg, 1980, Bertrand Monnet, architect. In May 2011 the basin was empty and the fountain was not working.

Fontaine Saint-Jean, Square Saint-Jean-de-Grenelle, 147 rue de Grenelle 1987.

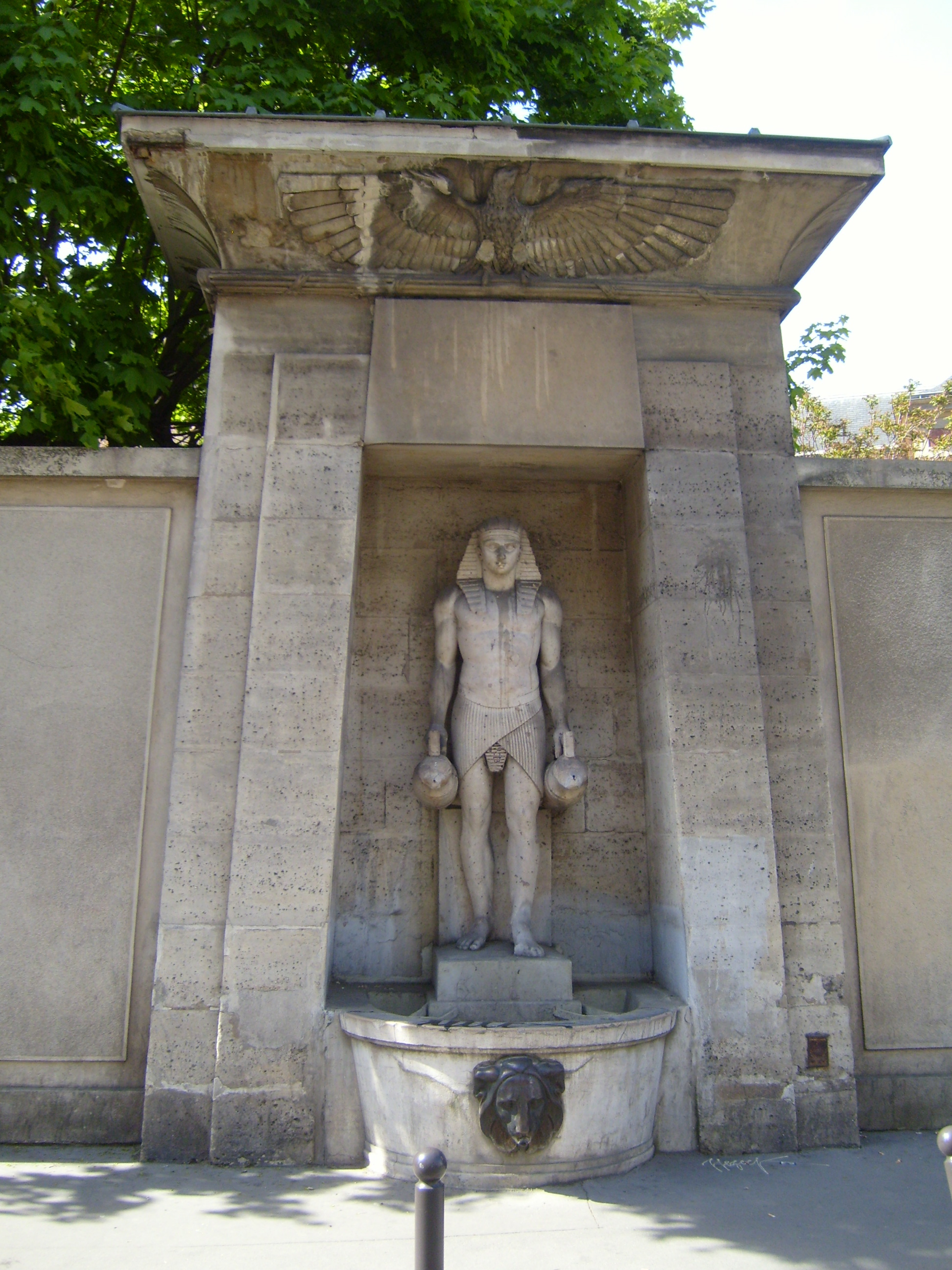
Fontaine du Fellah, 1806–08, (7th arrondissement)

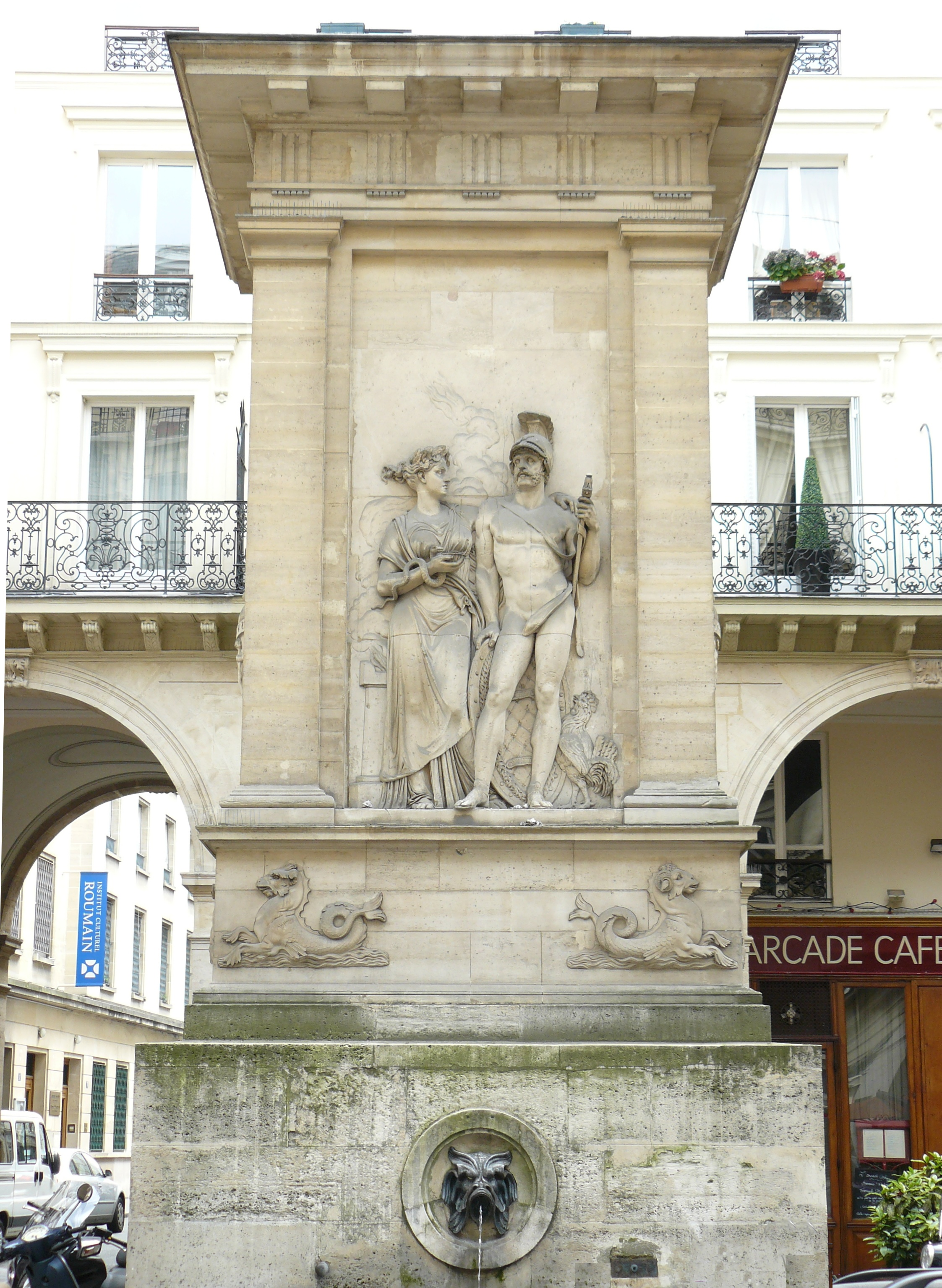
Fontaine de Mars, 1806. (7th arrondissement)

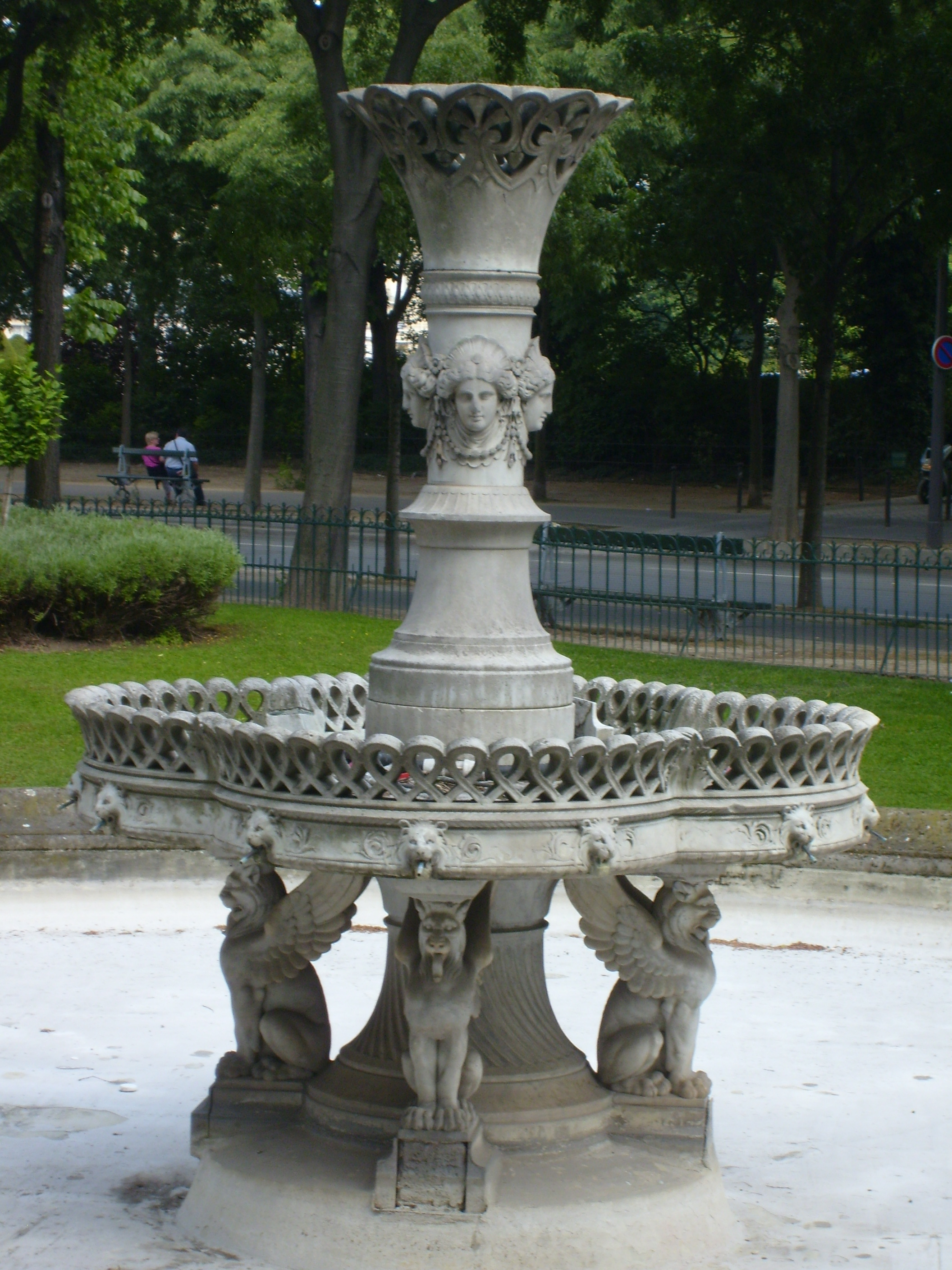
Fontaine de la Place de La Madeleine (1864–65). Originally in front of the Church de la Madeleine, moved in 1902. (7th arrondissement).

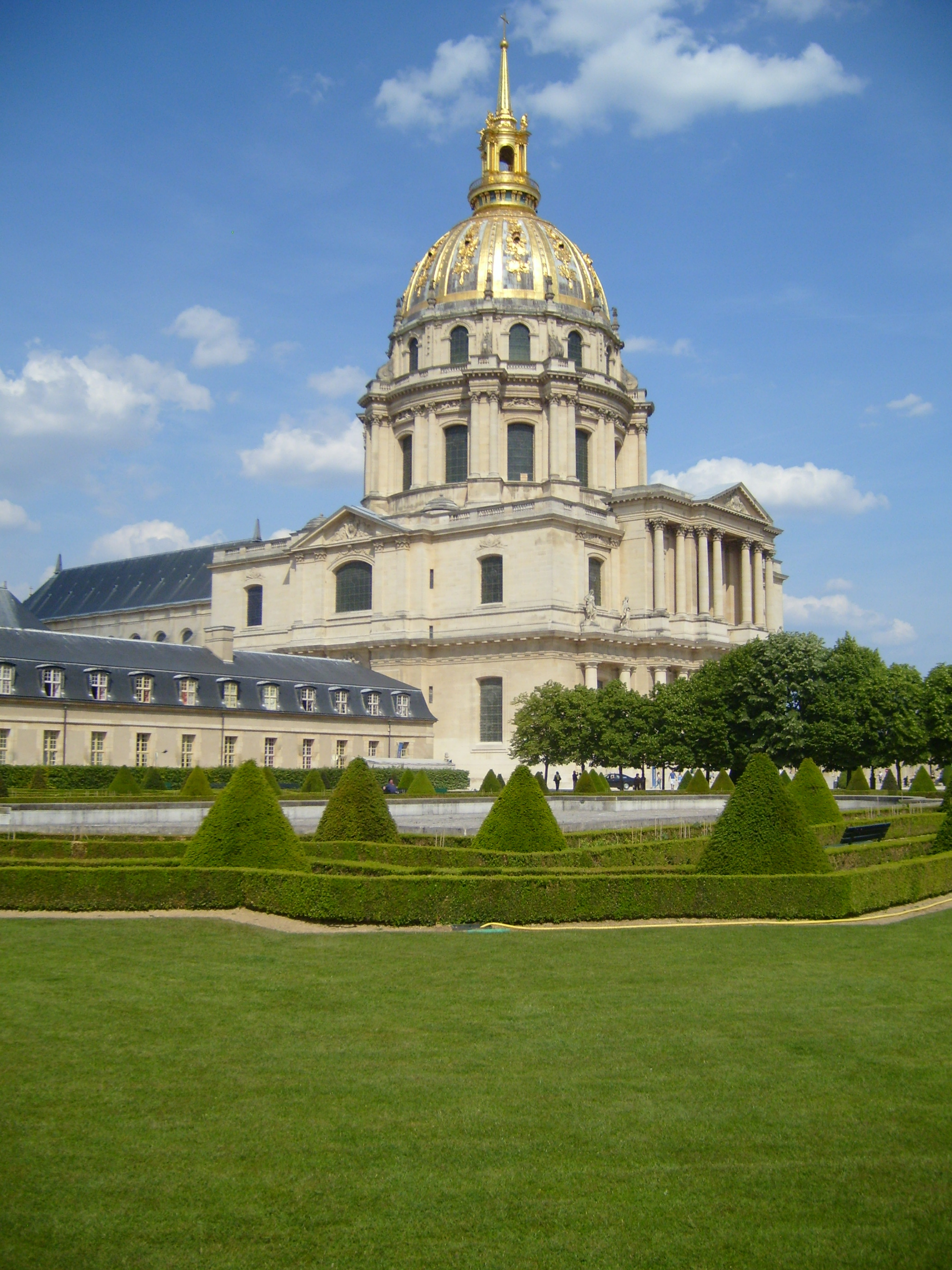
Fontaine de l'Intendant (1980), in the Jardin de l'Intendant next to the Church of Les Invalides (7th arrondissement)

== 8th arrondissement ==
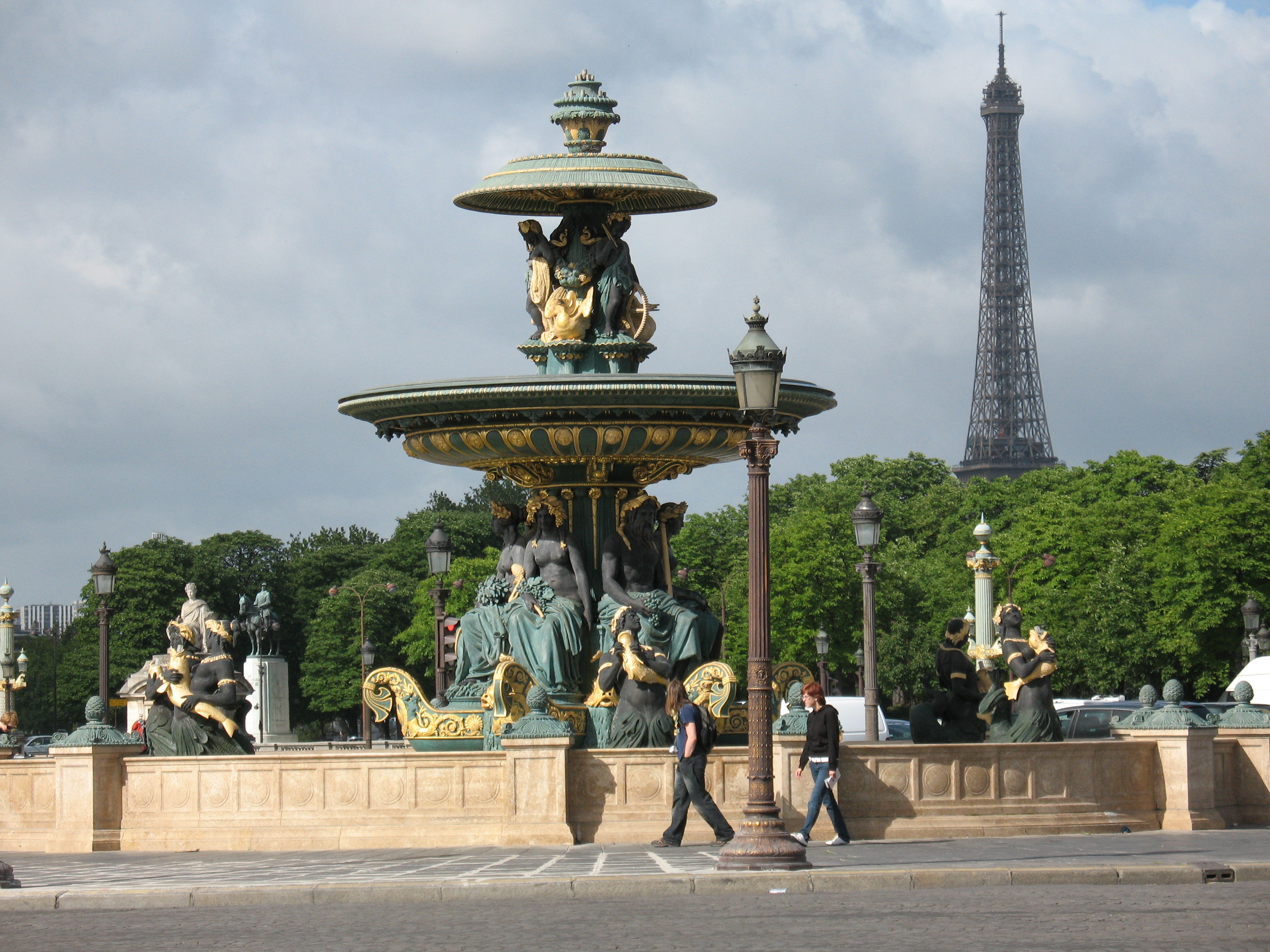
Fontaines de la Concorde,1836-40. (8th arrondissement)

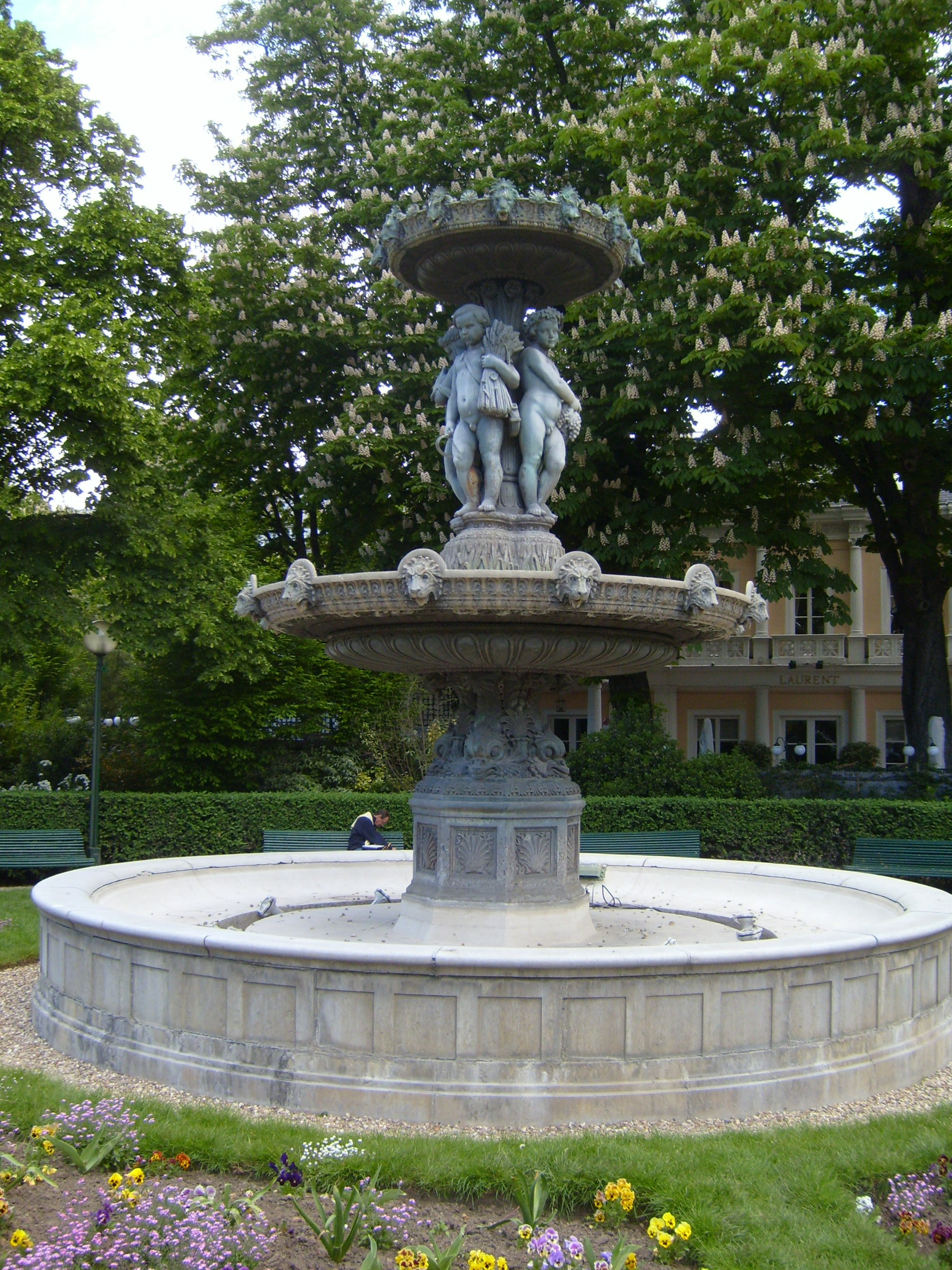
Fontaine du Cirque 1839, (8th arrondissement)

Fontaine du Cirque Gardens of the Champs-Elysées, 1839. Jacques-Ignace Hittorff, architect. Originally placed in the Rond-Point of the Champs-Élysées, it was removed in 1863 and replaced with the six basins designed by Gabriel Davioud. The fountain now stands in the gardens of the Champs-Élysées.

Fontaines des Champs-Elysées, Gardens of the Champs-Elysées, 1840. Jacques-Ignace Hittorff, architect; Francisque-Joseph Duret, Louis Desprez, Jean-Auguste Barre, sculptors.

Fontaine de Laborde, Square Marcel Pagnol, former square de Laborde. 1852. Gabriel Davioud, architect. Destroyed around 1968. It was replaced by the Fontaine Marcel-Pagnol in 1990.

Fontaines de la Concorde. Place de la Concorde, 1836–1840. Two fountains, symbolizing the sea navigation and river navigation in France, by Jacques-Ignace Hittorff.

Fontaine de la place François-Ier, 1865, Gabriel Davioud, architect. This fountain originally stood in the place de la Madeleine. but was moved to its present location in 1909.

Fontaine Alfred de Musset, Le Rêve du poèt. Cour la Reine, Grand Palais, 1910. A Moncel, sculptor.

Miroir d'eau, la Seine et ses affluents. Avenue du General Eisenhower, 1910. Raoul Larche, sculptor.

Fontaine du jardin du Petit-Palais. Cour la Reine, 1937. Raoul Lamourdedieu, sculptor.

Fontaines du Rond-Point des Champs-Elysées, 1958. The first fountain was made of glass by Dufour, architect and Max Ingrand, master glassmaker. Restored in 1986. A second glass fountain was made by René Lalique for the Paris Exposition in 1925. It was destroyed and replaced by the present-day fountains by architect Auguste Lambouret.

Fontaine Henri Bergson, place Henri-Bergson. 1969. Destroyed.

Fontaine Marcel Pagnol, Square Marcel-Pagnol, place Henry Bergson, 1990. Replaced the Fontaine de Laborde.

== 9th arrondissement ==
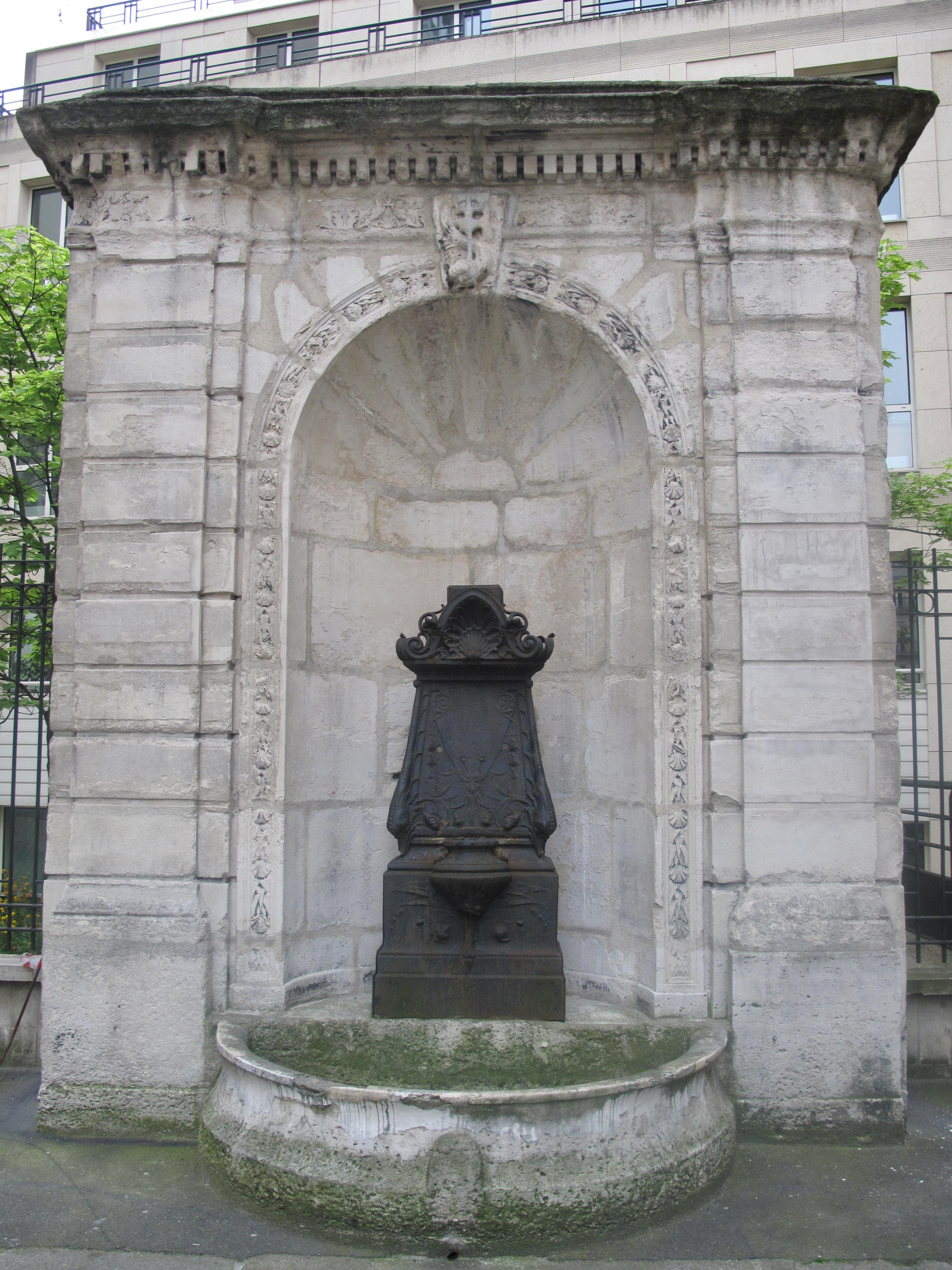
Fontaine du Coq, (9th arrondissement)

Fontaine du Coq, rue du Coq, 17th century. The fountain is a vestige of the Chateau des Porcherons, built by the Le Cocq family beginning in 1380. The chateau was left in ruins after the French Revolution, and was demolished in the mid-19th century, leaving only the fountain.

Fontaine Cardinal Mercier. Rue du Cardinal Mercier, former rue Nouvelle. (Date of construction unknown.)

Fontaine du Lycée Bonaparte, 1806–1807. Rue Neuve-Sainte-Crois, now rue Caurmartin.

Fontaine Saint-Georges. Place Saint-Georges. 1824–1825. Auguste Constantin, architect. (Destroyed 1904).

Fontaine Pigalle, or Fontaine de la Place de la Barrière-Montmartre, place Pigalle. 1862–1863. Gabriel Davioud, architect.

Fontaine de la Trinité, Square de la Trinité, 1864–1867. Théodore Ballu, architect. Francisque-Joseph Duret, Eugène Lequesne and François-Théophile Murgey, sculptors.'

Fontaine Stevens, rue Alfred-Stevens. 1933.

Fontaine de-la-Cité-Trévise, Cité de Trèvise, Edouard Moll, "Trois Nymphs", Architect, 1840.

Fontaine Drouot, 9 rue Druout, 1980, Jean-Jacques Fernier and André Biro, architects, and Dominique Babinet, sculptor.

== 10th arrondissement ==
Fontaine du Chaudron, corner of rue du Chaudron and rue Faubourg-Saint-Honoré, about 1718. Destroyed.

Fontaine du Faubourg Saint-Martin, Rue du Faubourg-Saint-Martin, 1848. Marie-Auguste Martin, sculptor. Destroyed between 1876 and 1933.

Fontaine Verdun-Valmy, Place Raoul-Follereau, 1981.

Fontaine de la Descent au Paradis, Hospital Saint-Louis, Reception hall, avenue Claude Villefaux, 1983, Daniel Badani and Pierre Roux-Dorlut, architect, Michele Blandel, sculptor.

Aqua Candida, Cour d'Honneur of the gare de l'Est, 1988, Michele Blondel, architect.

Fontaine Alban Stratagne, Square Alaban-Statagne, 107 bis rue du Faubourg Saint-Denis, 1990.

== 11th arrondissement ==
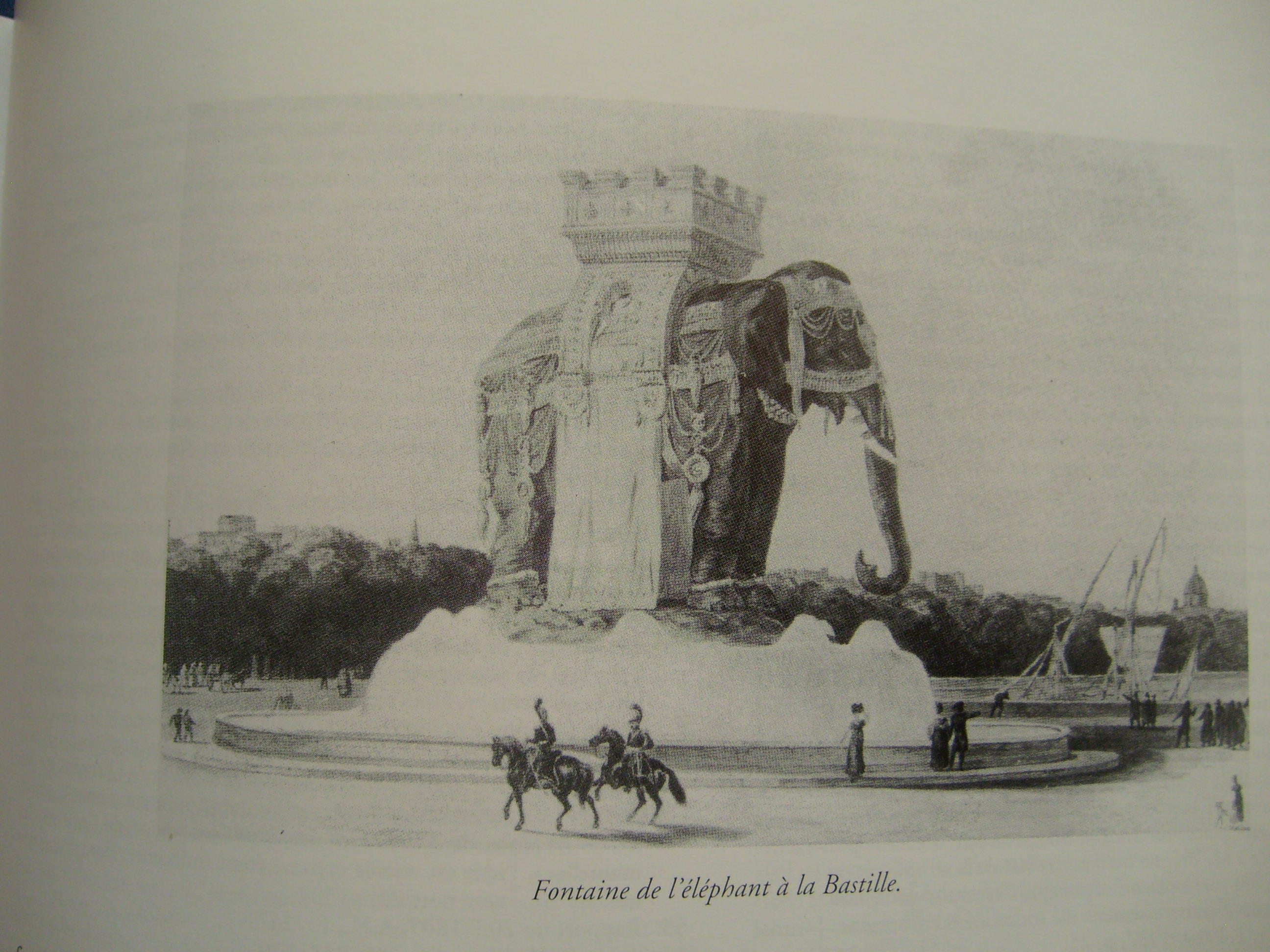
The Fontaine de l'elephant in the Place de Bastille. The fountain was begun in 1811 but never finished. A full-scale plaster model of the elephant stood in the Square until 1848.

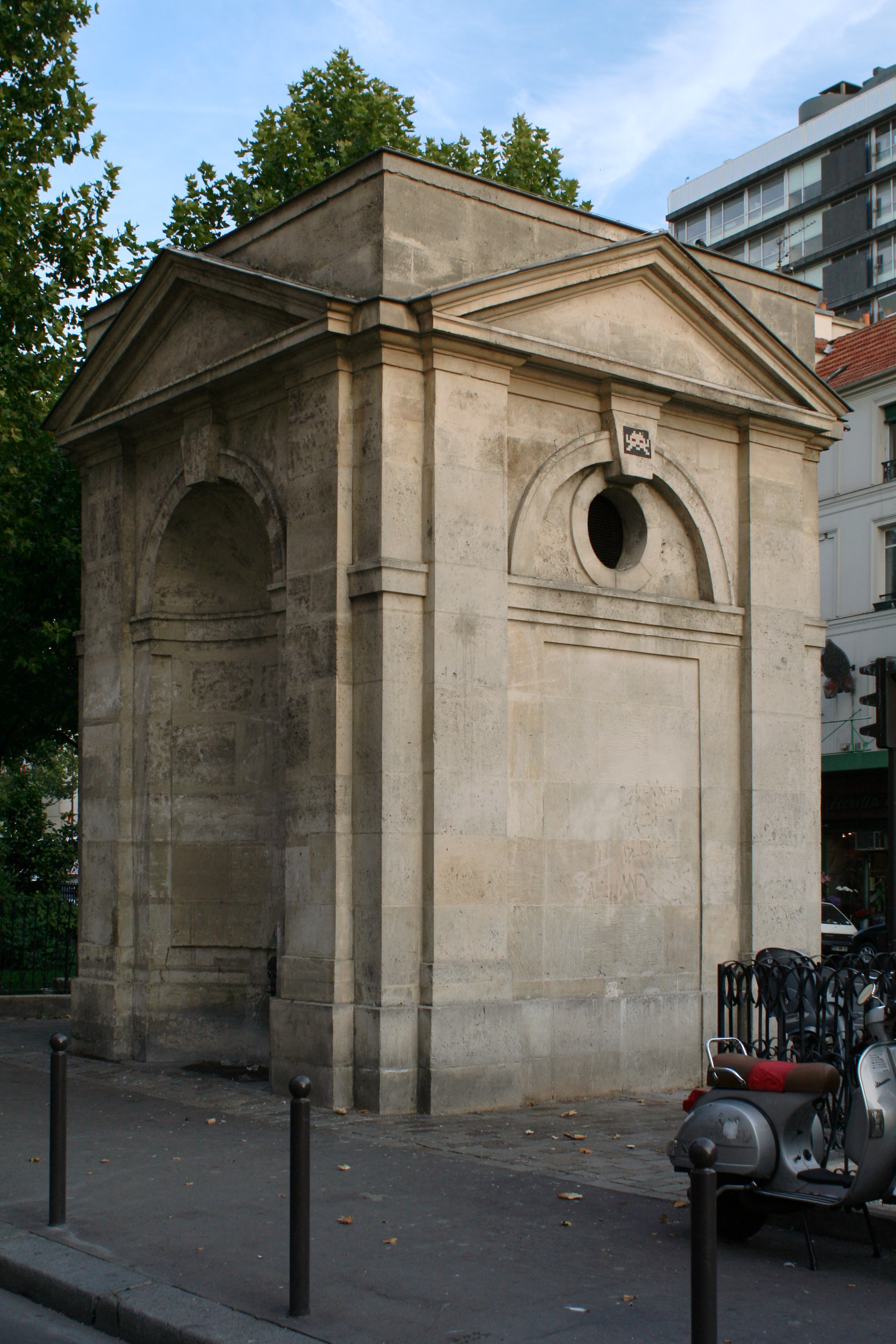
The Fontaine de la Petite-Halle by Jean Beausire, 1719.

Fontaine du Basfroid or Fontaine du Charonne, Corner of rue de Basfroid and rue de Charonne, 1719. Jean Beausire, architect.

Fontaine de la Petite-Halle or Fontaine de Montreuil, corner of rue du Faubourg-Saint-Antoine and rue de Montreuil, 1719. Jean Beausire, architect.

Fontaine de la rue Popincourt, or Fontaine de la Charité, Rue Popincourt, 1806. Louis-Simon Bralle, architect, Augustin-Félix Fortin, sculptor. The fountain was destroyed, but the bas-relief was preserved, and is now found at 48 rue de Sévigné.

Fontaine de l'Eléphant de la Bastille, Place de la Bastille, 1808. Célérier, Le Chevalier Jean-Antoine Alavoine, Pierre-Charles Bridan, architects. Model erected in 1817, removed in 1834.

Fontaine du Marché Lenoir, Marché Lenoir in the Faubourg-Saint-Antoine. Beginning of the 19th century, destroyed.

Fontaine du marché Popincourt, Rue Ternaux, 1837, destroyed.

Fontaine de la Roquette, 68 rue de la Roquette, 1846.

Basins of boulevard Richard-Lenoir, Boulevard Richard Lenoir. 1860–1861. Gabriel Davioud, architect. Transformed during the second half of the 19th century, replaced in 1994.

Fontaine du Triomphe de la République, Place de la Nation, 1879–1899. Jean Dalou, sculptor. The basin and water supply were removed in the 1960s, leaving only the group of sculptures.

Fontaine Dejean, Place Pas du loup, 1906. Jean Camille Formigé, architect, Charles Louis Malric, sculptor.

Fontaine de la Roquette, rue de la Roquette, 1977.

Fontaine de l'Allégorie de la Liberté, Place Léon-Léon Blum, 1983, Fonquernie, architect, Marcello Tommasi, sculptor.

Fontaine de la Cité Beauharnais, rue Neuve-des-Boulets,1986–88.

Fontaine de l'Impasse-des-Jardiniers, passage Dumas, 1992. Jean Rechstener, architect and Michel Mourouc, creator of the mural painting 'L'art topiare,' on the wall behind the fountain.

Fontaine du boulevard Richard-Lenoir, 1994. David Mangin, architect and Jacqueline Osty, landscape architect.

'

== 12th arrondissement ==
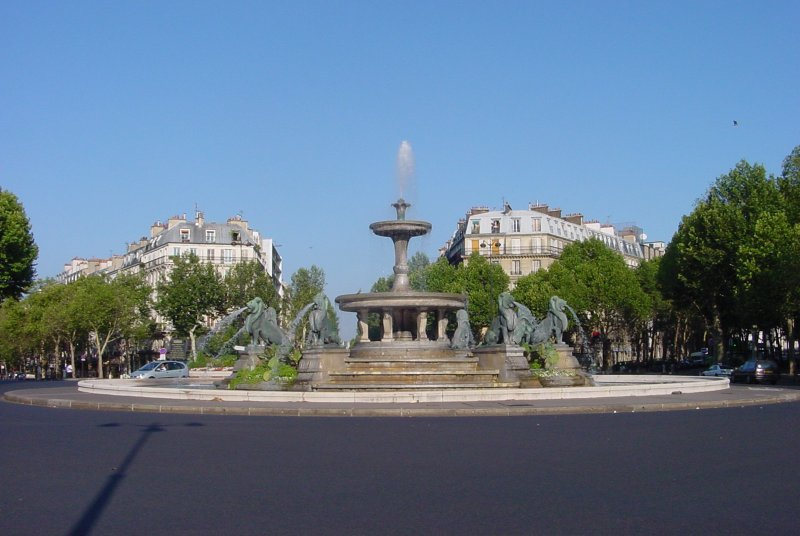
Fontaine du Château-d'Eau, 1869–74. (12th arrondissement)

Fontaine Hermann, or Fontaine de Rambouillet. Place du Colonel-Bourgoin, formerly Place Crozatier. Made in 1845, installed in its present location in 1882–1883.

Fontaine de marché d'Aligre, Marché d'Aligre, 1846.

Fontaine Sainte-Eugénie, 89 bis, rue de Charenton, 1846. Destroyed 1906.

Fontaine du Château-d'Eau, or Fontaine Daumesnil, Place Félix-Éboué, 1869–74. Gabriel Davioud, architect, Henri-Alfred Jacquemart and Louis Villemont, sculptors. Originally located in the Place de la République, it was moved in 1879 to its present location.

Fontaine de la Port Dorée, Place Edouard-Renard, 1935. Louis Madeline, architect, Léon Drivier, sculptor.

Fontaine Louttre, Parc Floral de Paris, route de la Pyramide, 1968, Marc-Antoine Louttre-Bissière, sculptor.

Cascade Suisse, Parc Floral de Paris, route de la Pyramide, 1969.

Fontaine du Point du rencontre, brumisateur, Parc Floral de Paris, route de la Pyramide, 1969. Jean Bernard, architect.

Fontaine Stahly in the Parc Floral, in the Bois de Vincennes 1969. This fountain, by sculptor François Stahly and landscape architect Daniel Collin, is composed of blocks of granite intermingled with cascades and jets of water.

Fontaine de la Baleine-Bleu, Jardin de l'ilôt Saint-Eloi, 1–17, rue du Colonel Rozanoff 1982, Michel Le Corre, conception, and Gabrielle, Brechon, sculptor. A ceramic representation of a blue whale.

Fountain of the Parvis of the Palais Omnisport of Paris or Fontaine du Canyoneaustrate, Parc du Bercy, 1988. Gérard Singer, sculptor. A modern rendition of a water-carved natural canyon.

Fontaine Charenton, Square, 177 rue de Charenton, 1986–1992.

Fontaine Courteline, Place Courteline. Date unknown.

Fontaines du Ministère, located in the courtyard of the Ministry of the Economy and Finance, 1 boulevard de Bercy, 1988. Paul Chemetov and Borja Huidobro, architects.

Fontaine Charles-Péguy, Square Charles Péguy, rue Montempoivre 1989, Alain Gilot, architect, and Liliane Grunig Tribel, landscape architect.

Fontaine Reuilly, Placette Reuilly, 1992. Roland Schweitzer, architect.

Fontaines du jardin de Reuilly, Jardin de Reuilly, avenue Daumesnil, 1992. Pierre Colboc, architect.

Fontaines de la Memoire, Parc de Bercy, 1996. Bernard Huet and Jean-Pierre Feugas, architects.

Fontaine Van Vallenhoven, Square Van Vallenhoven, date unknown.

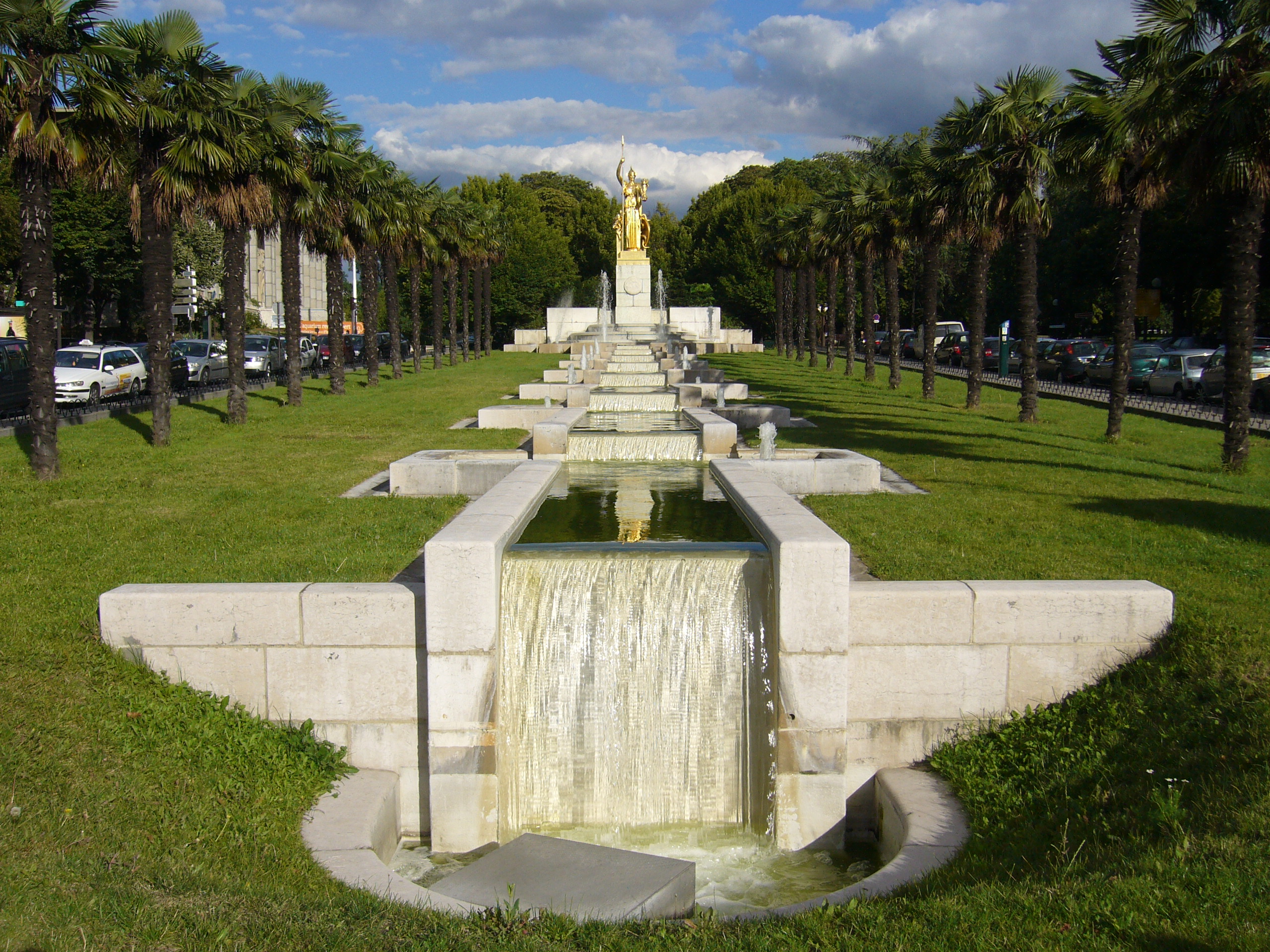
Fontaine de la Port Dorée, Place Edouard-Renard, 1935, (12th arrondissement)

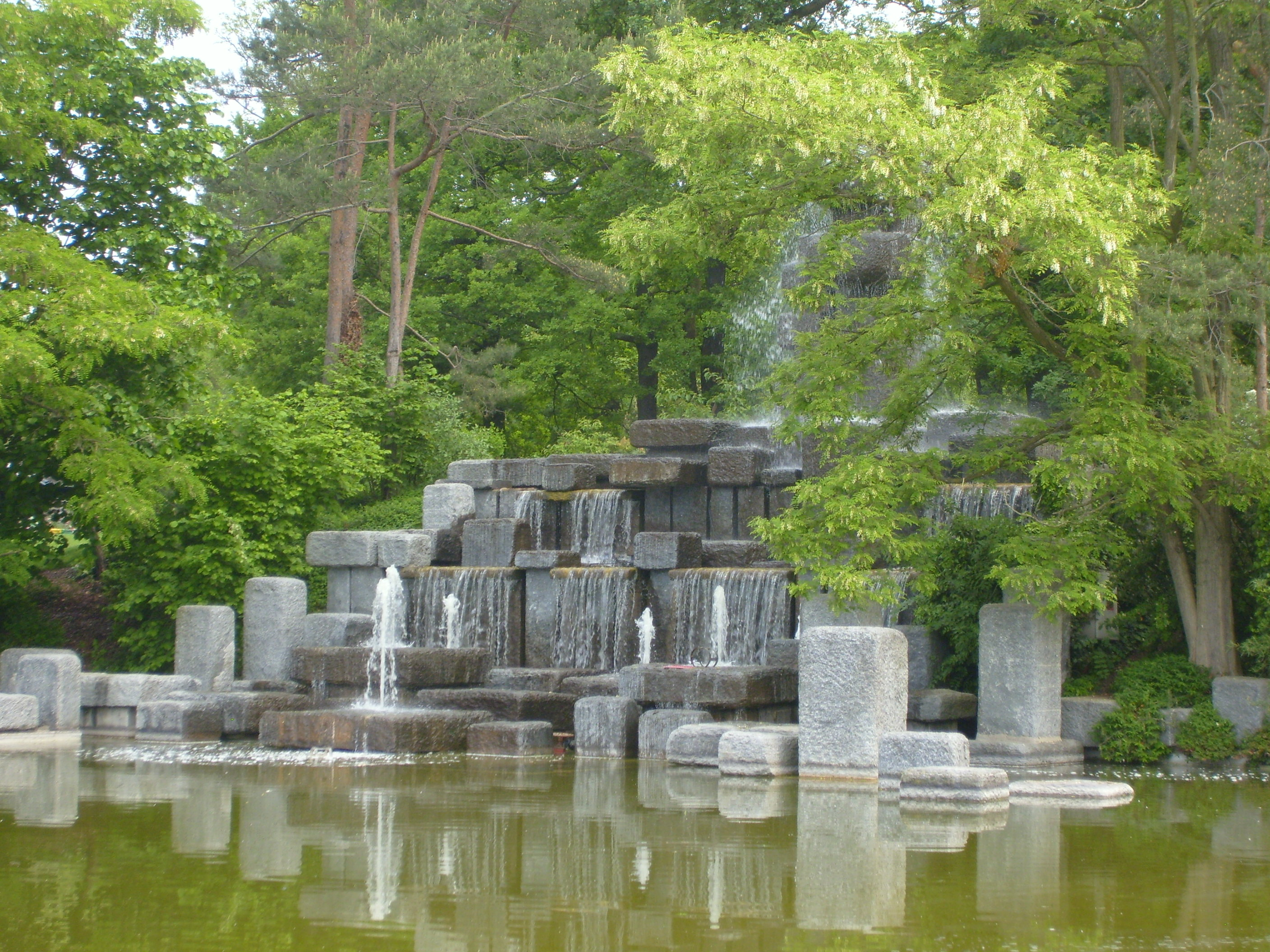
Fontaine Stahly, Parc Floral, Bois de Vincennes (12th arrondissement)

== 13th arrondissement ==
Fontaine Souham, Place Souham 1983, Alberto Guzman, sculptor.

Fontaine à l'Outre, Jardin Baudricourt, rue de la Pointe-d'Ivry, 1985, Claude Mary, sculptor.

Fontaines Michelet, Square Michelet, rue de Tolbiac and rue Wertz 1989, François Soulier, architect, and Michel Pena, landscape architect.

Fontaine Juan-Mirò, Rue Gandon 1990.

Fontaine Arago, Square Arago 69, boulevard Arago 1990, César Demela, architect.

Fontaine Hélène Boucher, Square Hélène Boucher, avenue de la Porte-d'Italie, 1991.

Fontaines Héloise-et-Abélard, Square Héloise-et-Abélard, 22 rue Pierre Gourdault 1991, Thierry Laverne and Philippe Raguin, landscape architects.

Fontaines du Moulin-de-la-Pointe, Jardin de Moulin-de-la-Pointe, 109, avenue d'Italie,1992, Gilles Vexlard and Laurence Vachelot, architects.

La Danse de la fontaine emergente (2008), Place Augusta-Holmes, rue Paul Klee. Designed by Chen Zhen and completed by his widow Xu Min.

== 14th arrondissement ==
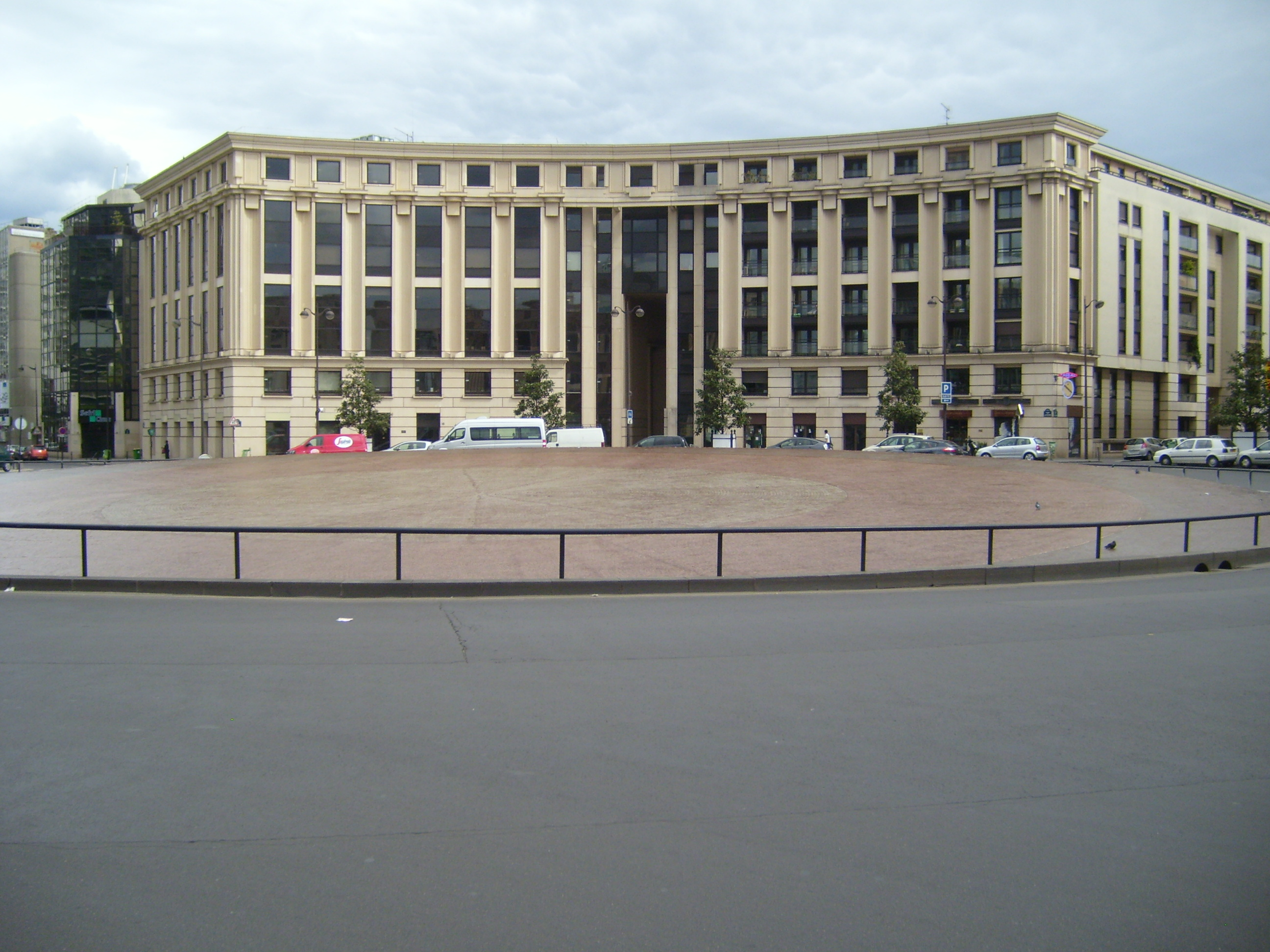
Fontaine du Creuset-du-Temps, Place de Catalogne (1988).

Fontaine des Capucins-Saint-Jacques, at the corner of faubourg Saint-Jacques and the present boulevard Port-Royal, (1848). Destroyed in 1866 or 1868.

Fontaine de l"Aspirant-Dunant, Square de l'Aspirant Dunant, (early 20th century).

Fontaine du Printemps, Square Mairie du XIV, (1927), Gilbert Privat, sculptor.

Fontaine du Printemps, Square Calmette, (1932), Paul Manaut and Gilbert Privat, sculptors

Fontaine Jean-Moulin, Square Jean-Moulin, porte de Châtillon, (1957).

Fontaine Alésia-Ridder, Square Alésia-Ridder, 213 rue d'Alèsia (1972, 1976).

Fontaine Vercingétorix, Place de la Porte-de-Vanves (1978)

Fontaine Bardinet, Square Bardinet-Jacquier, rue Bardinet (1981).

Fontaine du Creuset-du-Temps, Place Catalogne (1988), Shamai Haber, sculptor

Fontaines Ferdinand-Brunot, Mairie, 2, place Ferdinand-Brunot (1988), Bruno Courtade, architect.

Fontaine des Hespérides, Jardin Atlantique, pont des CInq-Martyrs (1994). François Brun, Christine Schnitzler, architect, and Michel Pena, landscape architect.

Fontaine des Humidités, Jardin Atlantique, salle des Humidités (1994), François Brun, Christine Schnitzler, architect, and Michel Pena, landscape architect.

Fontaine des Miroitements, Jardin Atlantique, salle des Miroitements, (1994), François Brun, Christine Schnitzler, architect, and Michel Pena, landscape architect.

== 15th arrondissement ==
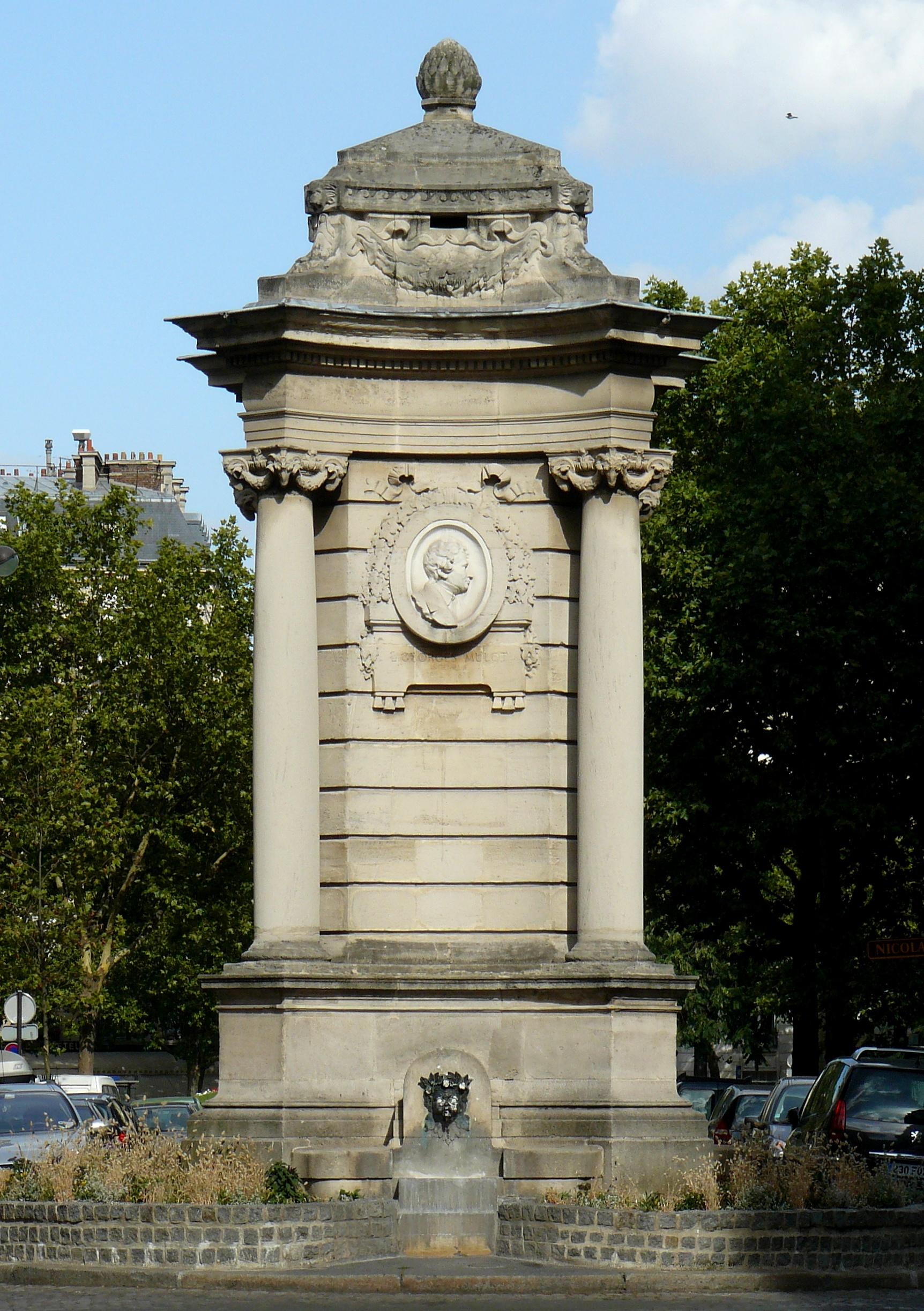
Fontaine du Puits de Grenelle, 1905 (15th arrondissement)

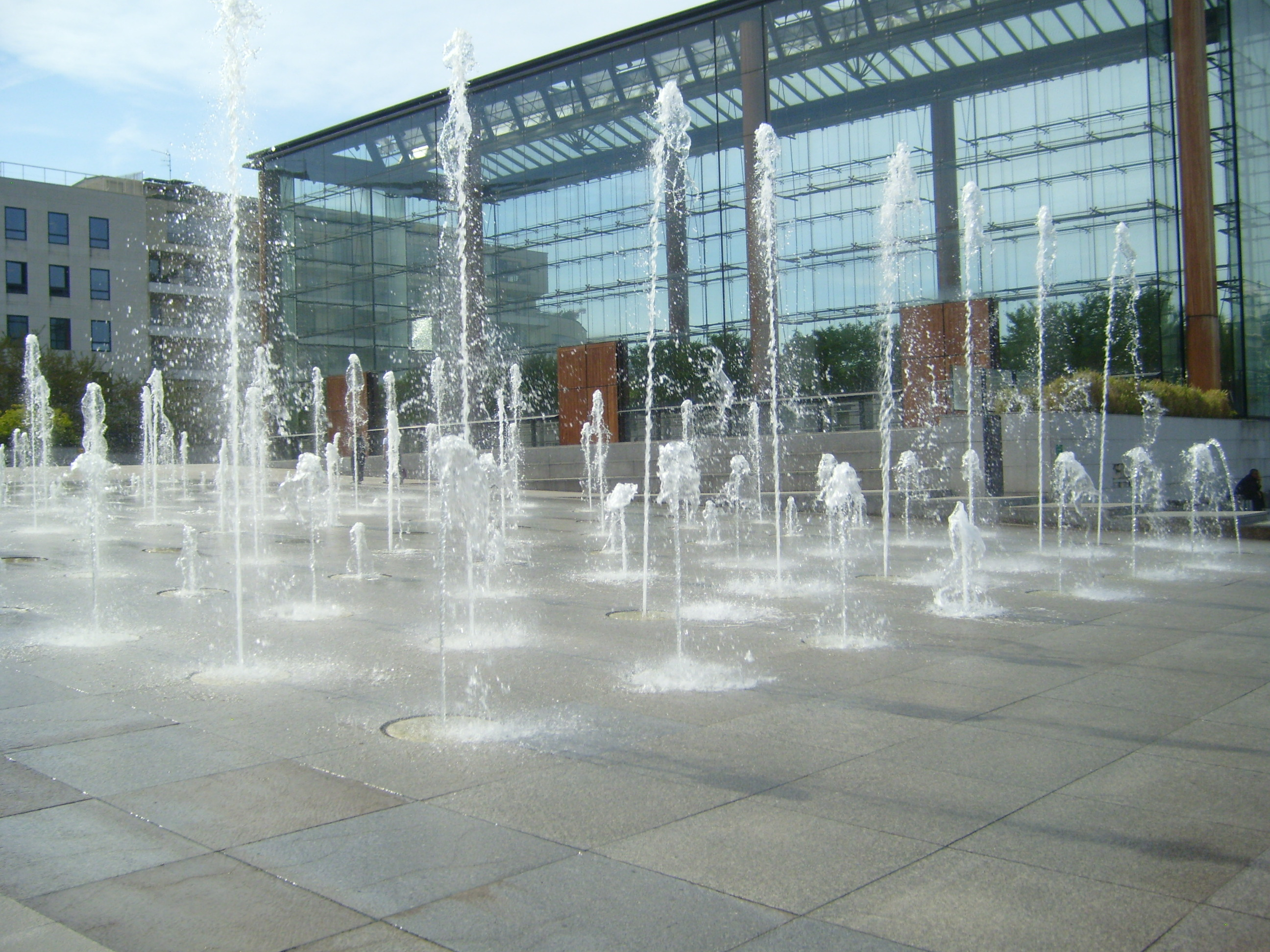
Colonnes d'eau, Parc André Citroën, 1992. (15th arrondissement)

Fontaine du Puits de Grenelle, Place Georges-Mulot, (1905). Commemorating the artesian wells of Grenelle. Jean-Camille Formigé, architect; Waas, Georges-Philippe-Eugène Loiseau-Bailly, Firmin-Marcelin Michelet, Lefebvre. sculptors.

Fontaine Saint-Lambert, Square Saint-Lambert, rue Theophraste-Renaudot (1957–58), Dupuis, architect.

Fontaine Nélaton, the PPT Building, Rue Nélaton (1966), Pierre Dufau, architect and René Collamarini, sculptor.

Fontaine Boule des Périchaux, Square des Périchaux, boulevard Lefebvre, (1974).

Fontaine Wassily-Kandinsky, Place Wassily Kandinsky, (1974), Madame Balint de Jeckel, sculptor. Removed 1980.

Fontaine de la Convention, 1 rue Alain-Chartier, (1979). Removed in 1994.

Fontaine du Docteur-Finlay, 21 rue du Docteur-Finlay (1980), Michel de Sablet, designer.

Fontaine des Polypores, Square Jean-Cocteau, rue Balard (1981), Jean-Yves Lechevallier, sculptor.

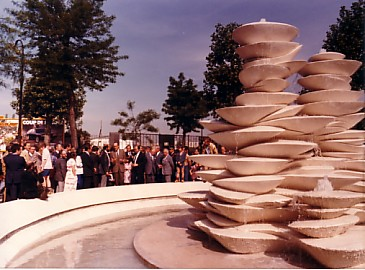
Fontaine des Polypores. Jean-Yves Lechevallier

Fontaine Béla-Bartók, Square Béla-Bartók, rue Rouelle, (1980), Jean-Yves Lechevallier, sculptor.

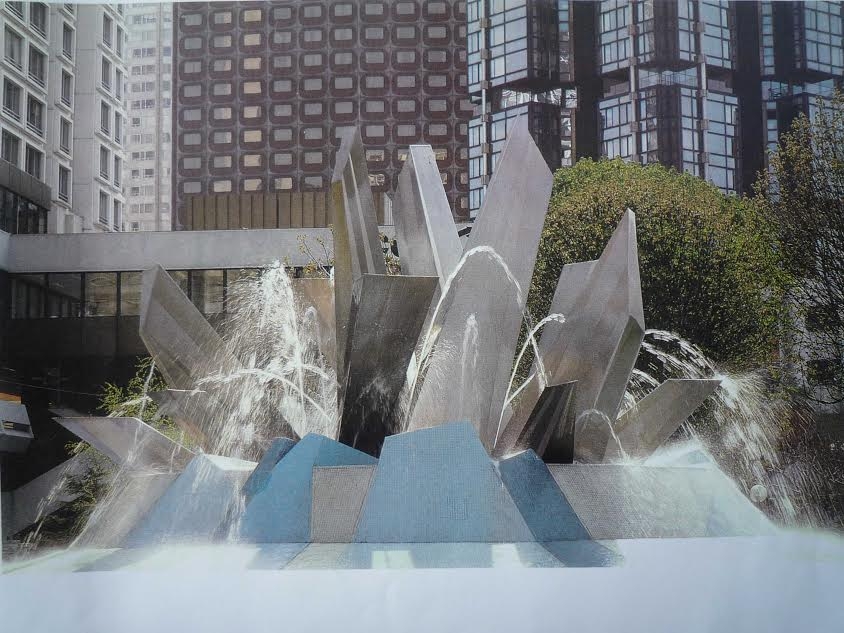
Fontaine Béla-Bartók or "Cristaux". Jean-Yves Lechevallier

Hommage à Brancusi, Hospital Necker, cour des Départs des convois, impasse Ronsin (1984), François-Xavier Lalanne, sculptor.

Fontaines Aristide-Maillol, 103 rue Falguière (1984), Michel de Sables, designer.

Fontaines Georges-Brassens, Parc Georges-Brassens, 36 bis, rue des Morillons, (1985), J.-M.Milliex and Alexander Ghiulamila, architects.

Fontaine d'Alleray, Jardin d'Alleray-Procession, 58 rue de la Procession (1988).

Fontaine Saint-Charles, Square Saint-Charles, rue Balard, (1989).

Fontaine Saint-Haon, 21 rue Balard, (1991), Aymeric Zublena, sculptor.

Colonnes d'eau, Parc André Citroën, (1992), Patrick Berger, Jean-Paul Viguier, Jean-François Joddry, architects, Alain Provost and Gilles Clément, landscape architects.

Fontaines du Jardin Noir, Parc André Citroën, (1992), Patrick Berger, Jean-Paul Viguier, Jean-François Joddry, architects, Alain Provost and Gilles Clément, landscape architects.

Fontaines des Jardins Sériels, Parc André Citroën, (1992), Patrick Berger, Jean-Paul Viguier, Jean-François Joddry, architects, Alain Provost and Gilles Clément, landscape architects.

Nymphées, Parc André Citroën, (1992), Patrick Berger, Jean-Paul Viguier, Jean-François Joddry, architects, Alain Provost and Gilles Clément, landscape architects.

== 16th arrondissement ==
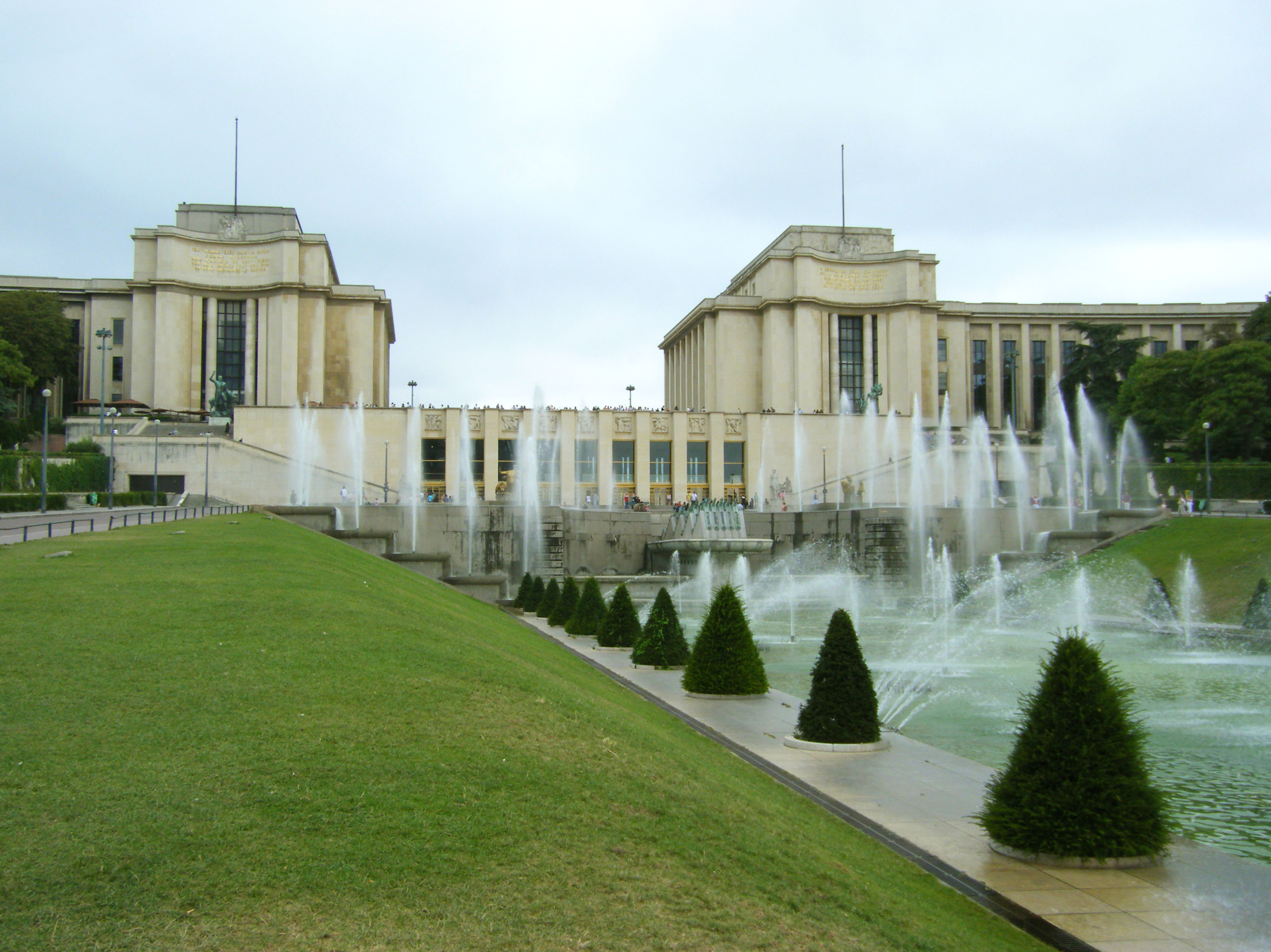
Fontaines du Trocadéro, 1937. (16th arrondissement)

Fontaine de la place d'Eylau, Place Victor-Hugo, former Place d'Eylau, 1837. Heudebert, architect. Destroyed between 1897 and 1901.

Bacchantes, Jardin fleuriste, porte d'Auteuil, (1897). Jules Dalou, sculptor.

Fontaine d'Avril, Square Galliera, 15 Avenue du President-Wilson, (1906). Pierre Roche, sculptor.

Fontaine Levassor, Porte Maillot, (1907), Jules Dalou, then Lefevre, sculptors.

Fontaine des Amours de Bagatelle. Parc de Bagatelle, (1919). Raymond Sudre, sculptor.

Fontaine Joachim-Gasquet, Square du Fleuriste, port d'Auteuil, 7, avenue du Parc-des-Princes, (1923). Auguste Guenot, sculptor.

Fontaine de l'Amour, or l'Eveil à la Vie, Place de la Porte-d-Autueil, (1926). Raoul Lamourdedieu, sculptor.

Fontaine Claude Debussy, Square Claude-Debussy, (1932). Jan and Joël Martel, sculptors, Jean Burkhalter, sculptor.

Fontaine Tolstoi, Square Léon Tolstoi, (1934). Cassou, sculptor.

Fontaine Anna-de-Noailles, Square Anna-de-Noailles, (1935). Courbier, sculptor.

Fontaines de la Porte de Saint-Cloud, Place de la Porte de Saint-Cloud, (1936). Paul Landowski, sculptor. Robert Pommier and Jacques Billiard, architects.

Fontaines du Trocadéro, Esplanade du Trocadéro, (1937). Léon Azéma, Louis-Henri Boileau, Jacques Carlu, architects. Alexandre Descatoire, Marcel-Antoine Gimond, Jean Paris (called Pryas), Paul Cornet, Félix-Alfred Desruelles, Paul François Niclausse, Robert Couturier, Lucien Brasseur, sculptors. The animals in the original cascade of Trocadéro (1878) were moved to the terrace in front of the Musée d'Orsay, where they can be seen today. They were made by sculptors Alexandre Schoeneberg, Alexandre Falguière, Eugène Delaplanche, Ernest Hiolle, Aimé Millet, Mathurin Moreau, Emmanuel Frémiet, Alfred Jacquemart, Pierre Rouillard, and Auguste-Nicolas Caien.

Miroir d'eau du musée d'Art Moderne, (1937). Félix Favola, sculptor.

Fontaine de Varsovie, Jardin du Trocadéro, (1937). Roger-Henri Expert, Paul Maître, Adolphe Thiers, architects. Daniel Bacque, Léon Ernst Drivier, Georges-Lucien Guyot, Paul Jouve, Pierre Poisson, Pierre Traverse, sculptors.

Puits artésien de Passy, Square Lamartine, avenue Victor-Hugo (1956–1967), Dupuis, architect.

Fontaine Victor-Hugo, Place Victor-Hugo (1964), Davy, architect and Max Ingrand, master-glassmaker.

Fontaine du Pré-aux-Chevaux, Jardin du Pré-aux-Chevaux, rue Gros, (1990).

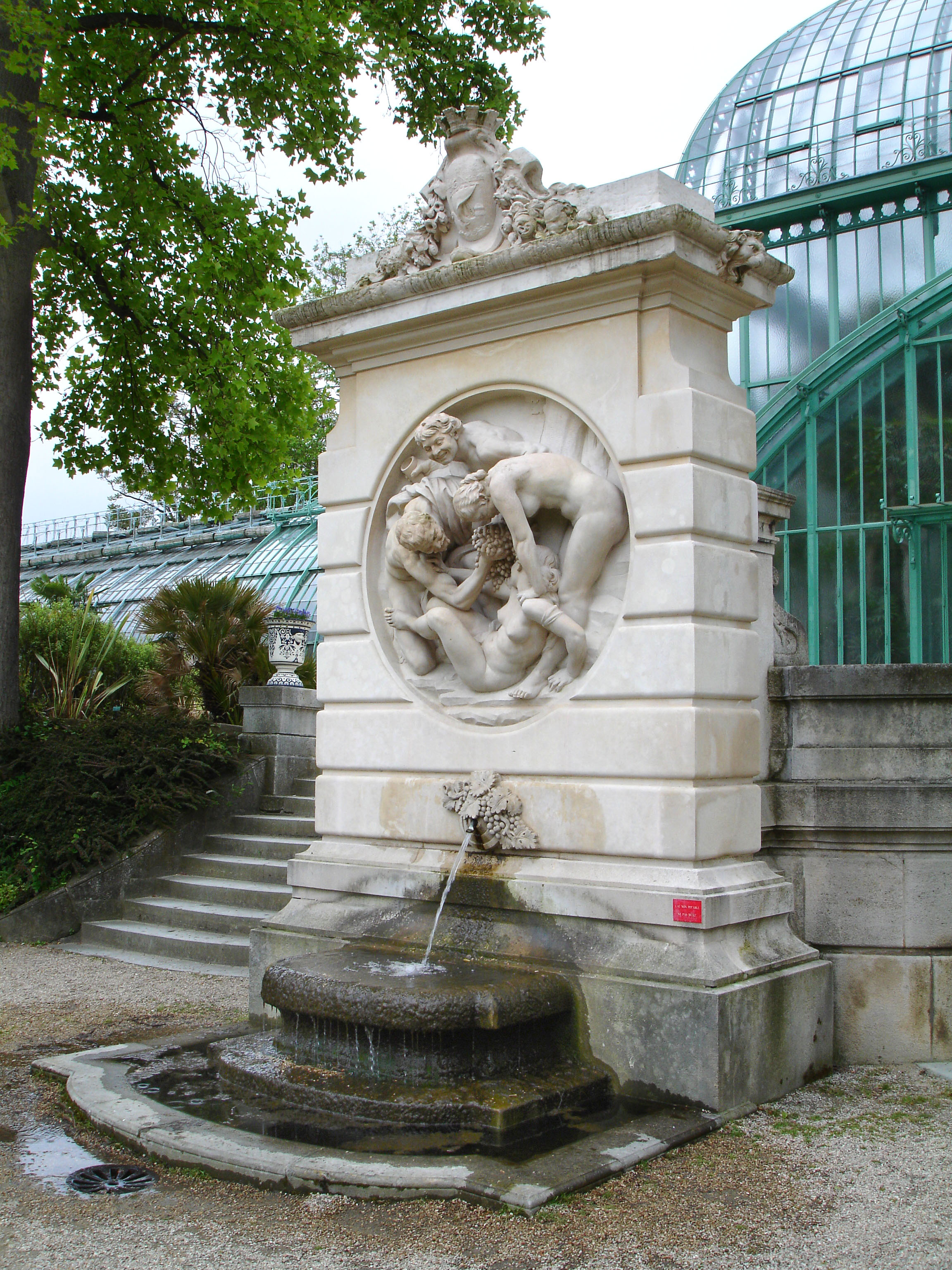
Bacchantes by sculptor Jules Dalou, (1897), by the greenhouses of Auteuil, (16th arrondissement)

== 17th arrondissement ==
Fontaine de la Cascade, Avenue de la Porte-de-Champerres (1988), Charles Gianferrari, plastic artist.

Fontaine Louis-Vierne, 6 rue Lous-Vierne (1989), Nicolas Bertoux, sculptor.

Fontaine de la Pyramide, fontaine Conique des Ecoles, 7 avenue de la Porte-de-Champerette (1988), Charles Gianferrari, plastic artist.

Fontaine Sainte-Odile, Square Sainte-Odile, avenue Stephane-Mallarmé (1976), Jean Camand, architect.

L'arc au nuage, ZAC Saussure. 28 bis, boulevard Pereire (1989), Sadko, sculptor.

== 18th arrondissement ==
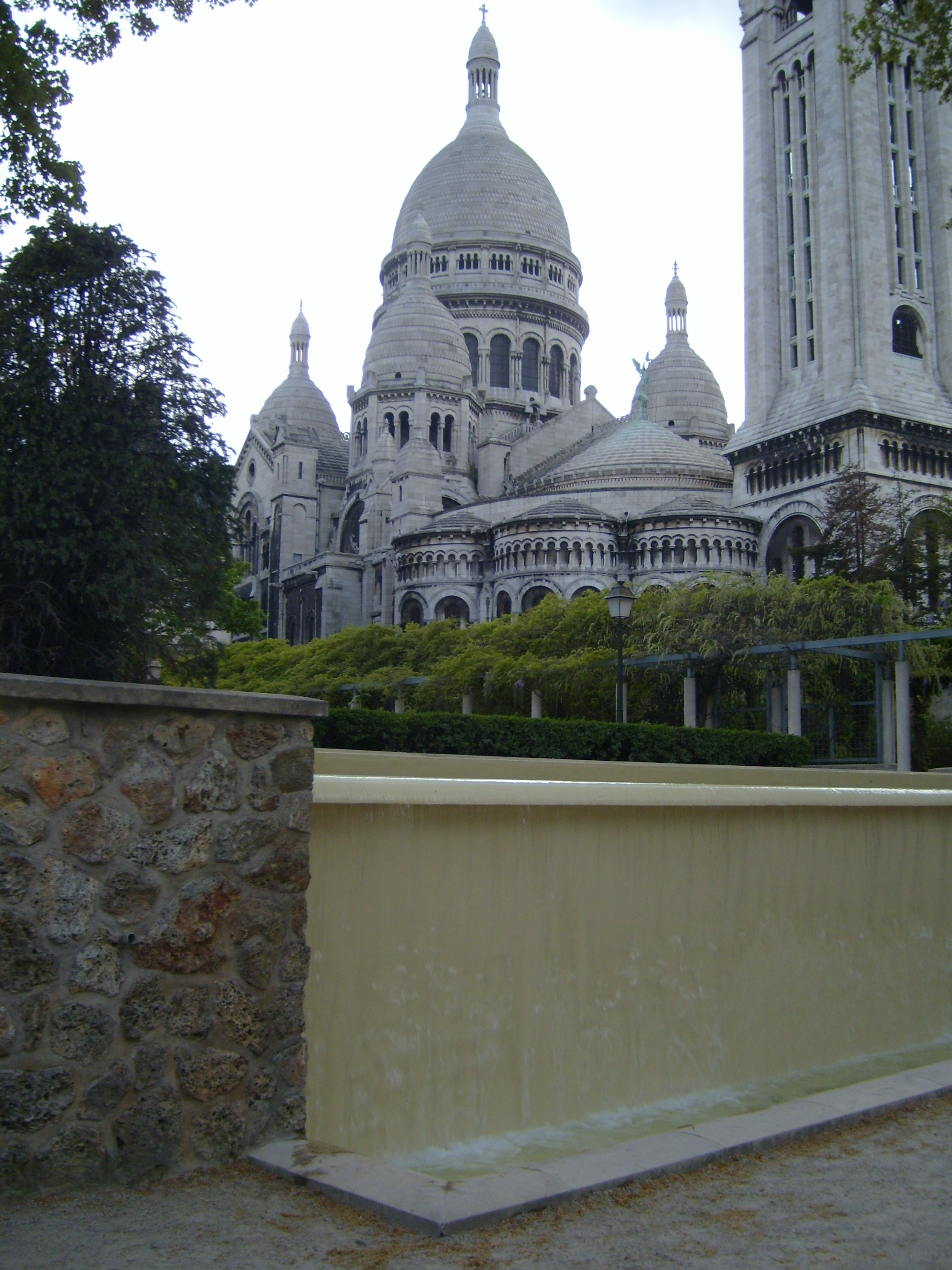
Fontaine de la Turlure, Parc de la Turlure, (1988). (18th arrondissement)

Réservoir-fontaine de Montmartre, Château d'eau de Montmartre, place Jean-Baptiste-Clément, (1835).

Petite fontaine des Innocents, Square Willette, (1906). Emile Derre, sculptor.

Château d'Eau, Butte Montmartre, place Jean-Baptiste-Clément, (1932). Paul Gasq, sculptor.

Fontaine Steinlen, Square Constantin-Pecqueur, (1936). Paul Vannier, sculptor.

Fontaine du Passage-Léon, Square du Passage-Léon (1990), Michel de Sablet, designer.

Fontaine Léon-Serpollet, Square Léon-Serpollet, rue de Cloÿs (1991), Serve Eyzat, architect.

Fontaine Rachmaninov, Square Rachmaninov, rue Tzara (1991), Kathryn Gustafson, landscape architect.

Fontaine de la Turlure, Parc de la Turlure, rue de la Bonne (1988), Antoine Grumbach and Pierre Caillot, architects.

== 19th arrondissement ==
Château d'eau du boulevard Bondy, Corner of rue de Bondy and Boulevard Saint-Martin, now in front of the grande Halle of la Villette, Porte de Pantin. (1809–1812). Removed from its original location in 1867.

L'Accueil de Paris, Femme au Bain. Square de la Butte-du-Chapeau-Rouge, (1938). Raymond Couvegnes, sculptor, Léon Azéma, architect.

Fontaine de la porte de La Villette, Square de la Porte-de-la-Villette, rue Forceval (1969).

Fontaine Riquet, Rue de Flandres/rue Riquet. (1978–1980), Martin S. Van Treeck, architect. Destroyed.

Fontaine Rébéval, Square Rébéval, 2 rue Marcel-Achard (1984), Denis Sloan, architect.

Fontaine des Douves, Douves de la Cité des Sciences et de l'Industrie, 30 avenue Corentin-Cariou (1986), Adrien Fainsilber, architect.

Fontaines de la Cité, Cité des Sciences et de l'Industrie, 30 avenue Corentin-Cariou, (1986), Adrien Fainsilber, architect.

Fontaine du jardin Loire-Jean-Jaurès, 74 rue Jean-Jaurès (1986), Jean Camand, architect, Adrien Fainsilber, architect.

Fontaine du jardin Mur d'eau, Cité des Sciences et de l'Industrie, 30 avenue Corentin-Cariou (1986), Adrien Fainsilber, architect.

Fontaine place des Fêtes, Place des Fêtes (1986), Marta Pan, sculptor.

Sigma antigravitationnel. Cite de Sciences et de l'lndustrie, 20 avenue Corentin-Cariou (1986–1990), Manolis Maridakis, sculptor.

Fontaine du Conservatoire, Conservatoire de Musique et de Danse, rue Bouret (1987), Fernand Pouillon, sculptor.

Fontaine du jardin des Bambous, Parc de la villette (1987), Alexandre Chemetov, architect.

Fontaine de la Folie de l'Antenne de Secours, Parc de La Vilette (1987), Bernard Tschumi, sculptor.

Fontaine du jardin de la Treille, Parc de la Villette (1987), Gilles Vexlard and Laurence Vacherot, architects.

Fontaine de Parc de la villette, Parc de la Villette (1987), Philippe Stark, architect.

Fontaine de la Folie des Enfants, Parc de la villette (1987), Bernard Tschumi, sculptor.

Le Cylinder sonore, Jardin des Bambous, Parc de la Villette (1987), Bernhard Leitner, architect and composer.

Fontaine place de Stalingrad, Place de Stalingrad (1989), Bernard Huet, architect.

Sculpture des nuées, Jardin d'eau, Parc de la Villette (1989), Alain Pelessier, architect and Fujiko Nakaya, sculptor.

Fontaine Ephésienne, Place de la Bataille-de-Stalingrad (1989), Georges Jeanclos, sculptor.

== 20th arrondissement ==
Fontaine de la Réunion, Parc de la Réunion, (1858). Paul-Eugène Lequeux, architect. Destroyed.

La femme aux poissons, Rue Sorbier, (1936), Dieupart, sculptor.

Fontaine des Grès, Square des Grès, Square des Grès, 57, rue de Vitruve (1983).

Le Génie des eaux, 45 rue des Amandiers (1985), Yvette Vincent-Alleaume, sculptor.

Fontaines de Charonne, Jardein de la garde de Charonne, 63 boulevard Davioud (1986).

Fontaine de la Réunion, Square de la Place de la Réunion (1987).

Fontaine Pali-Kao, Square de Pali-Kao, rue Julien-Lacroix (1988), François Debulois, architect

Fontaine des Amandiers, Square des Amandiers, rue des Cendriers (1988). Dominique Caire, architect.

Fontaine de Belleville, Parc de Bellville, rue Piat/rue Julien-Lacrois (1988), François Debulois, architect

Fontaine Saints-Simoniens, Square des Saints-Simoniens, 147, rue Menilmontant (1989), Marnix Raedecker, sculptor.

Fontaine Debrousse, Square Debrousse, 148 rue de Bagnolet.

Fontaine de la place Gambetta, Place Gambetta (1992), Alfred Gindre, architect, J. Dismier, master glass-maker, and Jean-Louis Rousselet, plastic artist.

Fontaine de la place des Grès, Place des Grès, (1992), Daniel Milhaud, sculptor.

== La Defense ==
Fontaine de Yaacov Agam, at La Defense. (1977). A colorful mosaic basin with water jets and lighted beacons suggesting the runway of an airport at night.

== Bibliography ==
- Paris et ses fontaines, de la Renaissance à nos jours, texts assembled by Dominque Massounie, Pauline-Prevost-Marcilhacy and Daniel Rabreau, Délegation a l'action artistique de la Ville de Paris. from the Collection Paris et son Patrimoine, directed by Beatrice de Andia. Paris, 1995.
- Yves-Marie Allain and Janine Christiany, L'art des jardins en Europe, Citadelles & Mazenod, Paris, 2006.
- Piganiol de La Force, Description historique de la Ville de Paris et de ses environs, Paris, 1745.
- A Duval, Les fontaines de Paris anciennes et nouvelles, Paris, 1812
- Hortense Lyon, La Fontaine Stravinsky, Collection Baccauréate arts plastiques 2004, Centre national de documentation pédagogique
