= Antoine Arnault =

French businessman (born 1977)

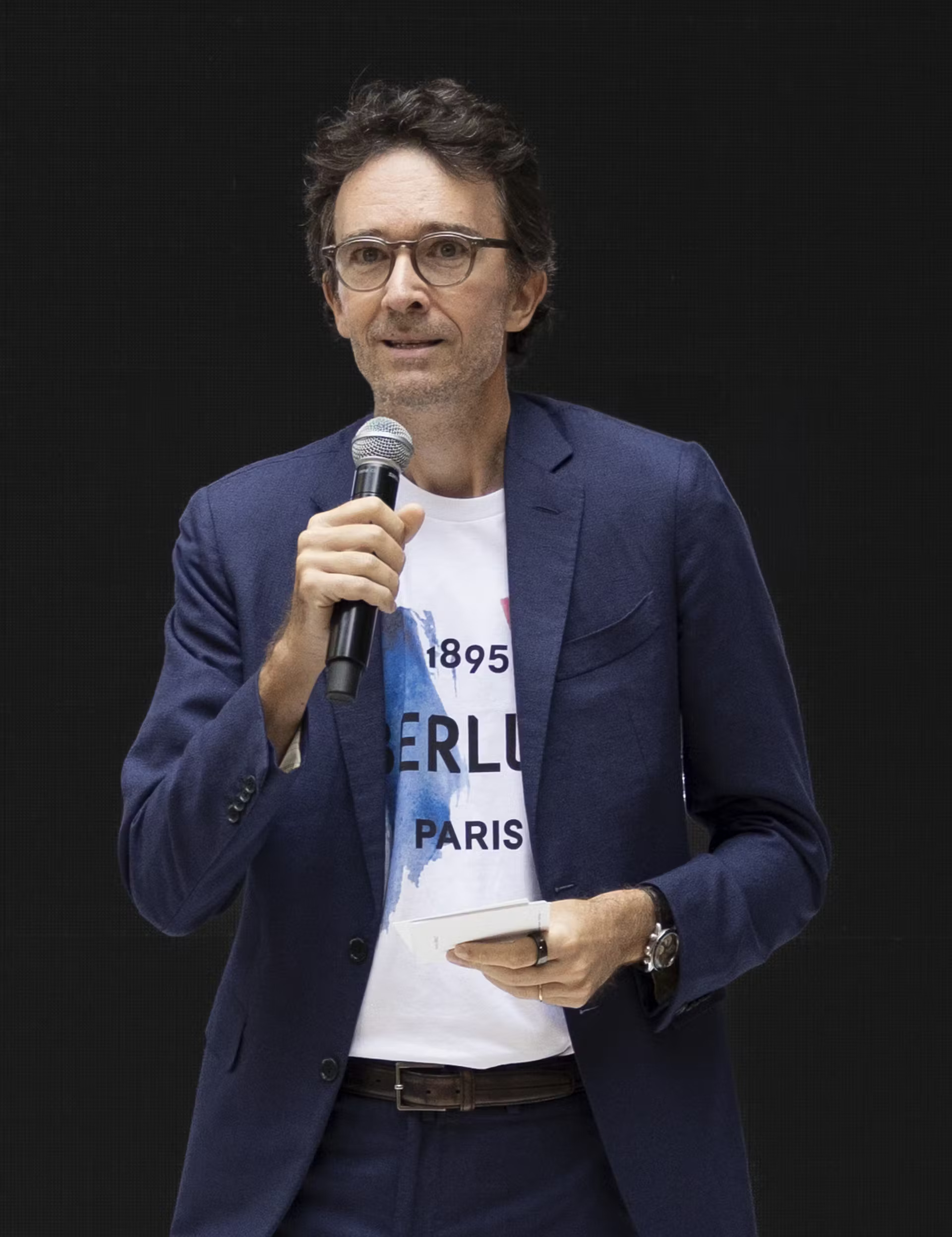
- Arnault in 2024
- Born: Antoine Bernard Jean Arnault; 4 June 1977 (age 49); Roubaix, France
- Education: HEC Montréal; INSEAD
- Occupation: Businessman
- Title: Vice-Chairman and CEO of Christian Dior SE
- Spouse: Natalia Vodianova (m. 2020)
- Children: 2
- Father: Bernard Arnault
- Relatives: Delphine Arnault (sister); Frédéric Arnault (half-brother)

Antoine Arnault (French pronunciation: [ɑ̃twan aʁno]; born 4 June 1977) is a French businessman who is the vice-chairman and CEO of Christian Dior SE. He is the second child and eldest son of billionaire Bernard Arnault, who controls LVMH Moët Hennessy Louis Vuitton. The Arnault family is one of the wealthiest in the world.

== Early life and education ==
Arnault was born in Roubaix as the son of Bernard Arnault and his first wife, Anne Dewavrin. He is a graduate of HEC Montréal and INSEAD. In his youth, he was part of a rock band called Woodhouse.

== Career ==
Arnault started his career in the advertising department of Louis Vuitton. In 2005, he was nominated to the board of directors and became director of communications in 2007.

Arnault created the "Core Values" campaign in 2012 featuring political figures (Mikhail Gorbachev), professional athletes (Muhammad Ali, Zinedine Zidane) and celebrities (Sean Connery, Francis Ford Coppola, Keith Richards).

In 2008, Arnault was nominated to the editorial independence committee of Les Echos, a major French daily journal and in 2009 he made the Young Global Leader Honourees list.

In 2011, Arnault launched LVMH "Special Days", the aim of which is to communicate about the expertise of the group. In 2013 he repeated the initiative and doubled the number of workshops open to the public, bringing the total to 42. The objective was to showcase the fact that the technical know-how was continually being passed on from skilled craftsmen onto the next talented generation.

=== Berluti, 2011–2023 ===
From 2011 to 2023, Arnault was the CEO of Berluti and worked to develop this LVMH brand through the opening of shops in California, Dubai and New York City. He hired the designer Alessandro Sartori in order to expand from being a colourful shoemaker household to a full-on menswear luxury brand name. Antoine Arnault has invested €100 million in developing the brand and its colourful footwear and classic modern fit clothes.

Under his guidance, in three years Berluti's business has grown from around $45 million to approximately $130 million a year in sales. In 2013, he became chair of Loro Piana, global leader in high-end cashmere and other fabrics, following the acquisition of the brand by LVMH.

Arnault gave several speeches on the subject of the luxury industry and its future. During the Condé Nast International Luxury Conference in 2015, he highlighted consumers' use of digital tools in daily life that encourages luxury brands to reach consumers through such technologies. But he stated that the luxury industry specific features lie in non-obsolescence and giving physical experience, as he underlined during his speech at Stanford University in 2004.

=== Christian Dior SE, 2022–present ===
In December 2022, Arnault was named chief executive of family holding company Christian Dior SE, replacing Sidney Toledano.

== Other activities ==
Arnault is on the board of directors of LVMH and has been a board member in the Comité Colbert since November 2012. He has been a board member at Madrigall, the holding company controlling family-owned French publisher Gallimard, since November 2013.

== Recognition ==
- Knight, National Order of the Legion of Honour (2025)

== Personal life ==
Arnault is the younger brother of Delphine Arnault and has three half-brothers from his father's second marriage to Canadian pianist Hélène Mercier; he is a contemporary art enthusiast.

Arnault met Russian model and philanthropist Natalia Vodianova in 2011. They have two sons together, born in 2014 and 2016. Vodianova announced their engagement on 31 December 2019. The COVID-19 pandemic forced the cancellation of their 27 June 2020 wedding at Saint-Pierre d'Hautvillers Abbey, and the couple officially married on 21 June 2020 at a Paris registry office.
