= Bernard Arnault =

French businessman (born 1949)

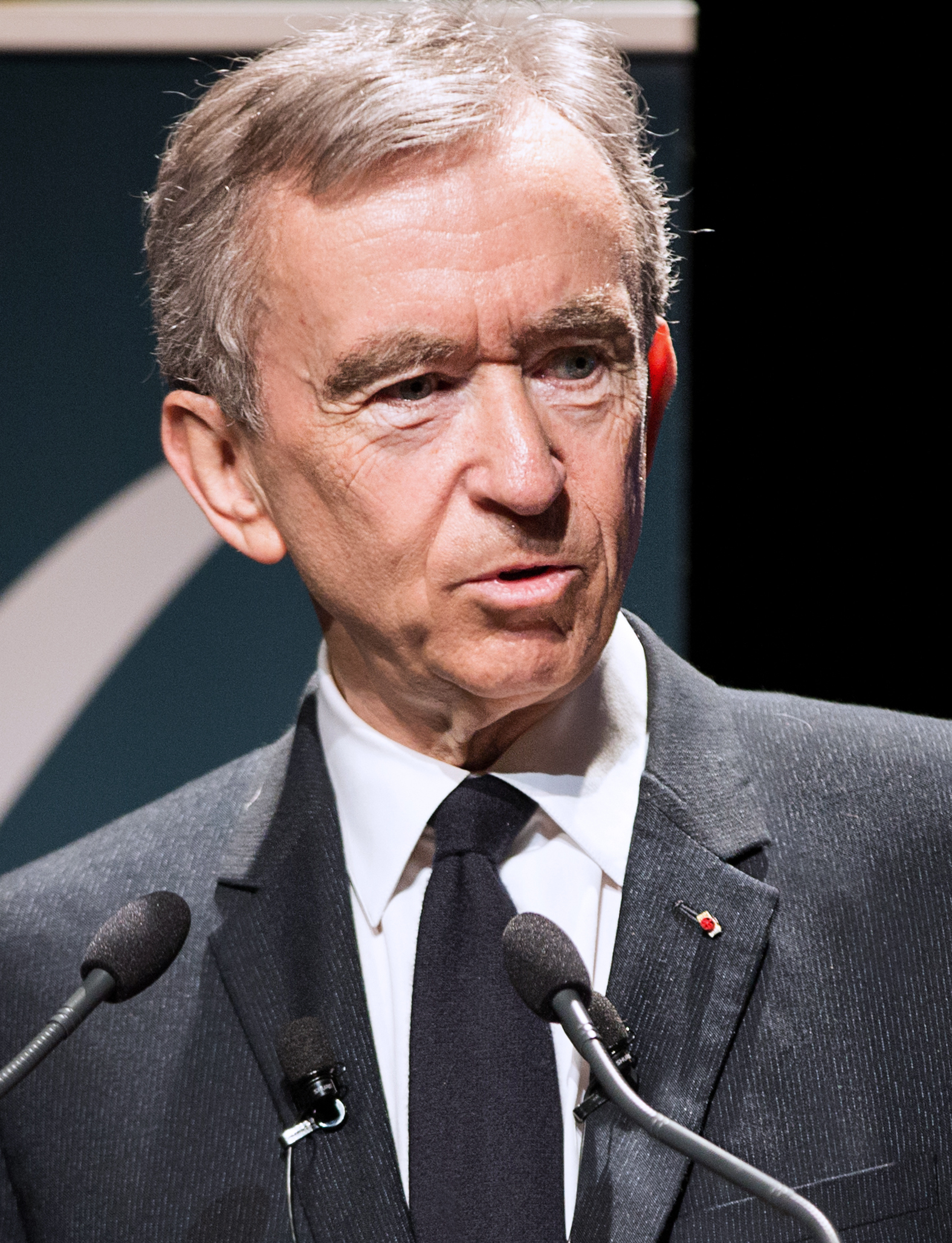
- Arnault in 2017
- Born: Bernard Jean Étienne Arnault; 5 March 1949 (age 77); Roubaix, France
- Education: École polytechnique
- Occupations: Businessman; media proprietor; art collector
- Title: Chairman and CEO, LVMH; Chairman, Christian Dior SE; Owner, Financière Agache
- Spouses: Anne Dewavrin (m. 1978; div. 1990); Hélène Mercier (m. 1991)
- Children: 5, including Delphine, Antoine and Frédéric
- Honors: Grand Cross of the Legion of Honour (2023)

Bernard Jean Étienne Arnault (Note: French: [bɛʁnaʁ ʒɑ̃ etjɛn aʁno]) (born 5 March 1949) is a French businessman. He is the chairman and chief executive officer (CEO) of LVMH, the world's largest luxury goods company. Arnault is one of the richest individuals in the world; as of December 2025, he has an estimated net worth of US$190.4 billion according to Forbes and US$203 billion according to the Bloomberg Billionaires Index.

Born in Roubaix, Arnault was raised in a devoutly Catholic household. He studied civil engineering and mathematics at École Polytechnique, graduating in 1971. He began his career in his father's company, Ferret-Savinel, shifting its focus to real estate, which laid the groundwork for his future career in the luxury goods market.

Arnault's entry into the luxury sector was marked by his strategic acquisition in 1984 of the financially-struggling textile and retail conglomerate Boussac Saint-Frères, which included the prestigious fashion house Christian Dior. His aggressive business strategies earned him the nickname "The Terminator", as he revitalized Dior and sold off other assets for profit. In 1987, he played a key role in the creation of LVMH (an abbreviation for Louis Vuitton Moët Hennessy), a global luxury goods company, by merging Louis Vuitton with Moët Hennessy. Through a series of strategic acquisitions and investments, Arnault built LVMH into a leading company in the luxury industry, overseeing significant growth and expansion into various sectors, including fashion, jewelry, watches, and wine.

Arnault's influence extends beyond LVMH, with investments in web companies and philanthropic endeavors, particularly in the arts. Following the 2019 Notre-Dame fire in Paris, he donated €200 million to the rebuilding efforts. He has also been involved in notable real estate and yacht ventures. His leadership has led to LVMH becoming the largest company by market capitalization in the eurozone. He has faced controversies, including an attempt to become a Belgian citizen.

== Early life and education ==
Bernard Jean Étienne Arnault was born on 5 March 1949 in Roubaix. His mother, pianist Marie-Josèphe Savinel, daughter of Étienne Savinel, had a "fascination for Dior". His father, manufacturer Jean Léon Arnault, a graduate of École Centrale Paris, owned the civil engineering company Ferret-Savinel. Raised in a "strict Catholic-Auvergne" style by his devoutly Catholic grandmother, Arnault took classical piano lessons as a child and was educated at Catholic schools, the Lycée Maxence Van Der Meersch in Roubaix and the Lycée Faidherbe in Lille, which takes boarders and prepares them for the grandes écoles.

In 1971, he finished his studies in civil engineering and mathematics at French university École Polytechnique in 1971

== Career ==
In 1971, soon after his graduation, Arnault began work for his father's company. Three years later, after he convinced his father to shift the focus of the company to real estate, Ferret-Savinel sold the industrial construction division and was renamed Ferinel. Following the acquisition of a textile company and relocation of its headquarters, the company renamed the real estate branch to the George V Group. The real estate assets were later sold to Compagnie Générale des Eaux (CGE), eventually becoming Nexity.

=== 1971–1987: Professional start ===
Arnault began his career in 1971, at Ferret-Savinel, and was its president from 1978 to 1984. In 1984, Arnault, then a young real estate developer, heard that the French government was set to choose someone to take over the Boussac Saint-Frères empire, a textile and retail conglomerate that owned Christian Dior.

With the help of Antoine Bernheim, a senior partner of Lazard Frères, Arnault acquired the Financière Agache, a luxury goods company. He became the CEO of Financière Agache and subsequently won the bidding war for Boussac Saint-Frères, buying the group for a ceremonial one franc and effectively taking control of Boussac Saint-Frères. After Arnault bought Boussac, he laid off 9,000 workers in two years, after which he acquired the nickname "The Terminator". He sold nearly all of the company's assets, keeping only the Christian Dior brand and Le Bon Marché department store. By 1987, the company was profitable again and booked earnings of $112 million on a revenue stream of $1.9 billion.

=== 1987–1989: Co-founding and acquisition of LVMH ===
He worked with Alain Chevalier, CEO of Moët Hennessy, and Henry Racamier, president of Louis Vuitton, to form LVMH in 1987.

In July 1988, Arnault provided $1.6 billion to form a holding company with Guinness which held 24% of LVMH's shares. In response to rumors that the Louis Vuitton group was buying LVMH's stock to form a "blocking minority", Arnault spent $600 million to buy 13.5% more of LVMH, making him LVMH's largest shareholder. LVMH had been created on the premise that the conglomerate would be too large for a single hostile raider. However, the premise failed to take into account internal takeover attempts. The fault became too large to ignore when Arnault had a differing strategic vision from Racamier, Louis Vuitton's president.

In January 1989, he spent another $500 million to gain control of a total of 43.5% of LVMH's shares and 35% of its voting rights, thus reaching the "blocking minority" that he needed to stop the dismantlement of the LVMH group. He then turned on Racamier, stripped him of his power, and ousted him from the board of directors. On 13 January 1989, he was unanimously elected chairman of the executive management board.

=== 1989–2001: LVMH's initial expansion and growth ===
After assuming leadership, Arnault led the company through an ambitious development plan, transforming it into one of the largest luxury groups in the world, alongside Swiss luxury giant Richemont and French-based Kering. In eleven years, annual sales and profit rose by a factor of 5, and the market value of LVMH increased by a factor of 15. In July 1988, Arnault acquired Céline. That same year, he sponsored French fashion designer Christian Lacroix to advertise the company's luxury clothing line. LVMH acquired Berluti and Kenzo in 1993, the same year Arnault bought out the French economic newspaper La Tribune. La Tribune never achieved the desired success, despite his €150 million, and he sold it in November 2007 to buy a different French economic newspaper, Les Échos, for €240 million.

In 1994, LVMH acquired the perfume firm Guerlain. In 1996, Arnault bought out Loewe, followed by Marc Jacobs and Sephora in 1997. Five more brands were also integrated into the group: Thomas Pink in 1999, Emilio Pucci in 2000, and Fendi, DKNY, and La Samaritaine in 2001.

In the 1990s, Arnault decided to develop a center in New York to manage LVMH's presence in the United States. He chose Christian de Portzamparreke to supervise this project. The result was the LVMH Tower that opened in December 1999. That same year, Arnault turned his eyes to Gucci, an Italian leather goods company, which was run by Tom Ford and Domenico De Sole. He discreetly amassed a 5 percent stake in the company before being detected. Gucci responded hostilely and called it a "creeping takeover". Arnault then upped his stake to 34.4 percent while insisting he wanted to be a supportive and unassertive stakeholder. De Sole proposed that in return for board representation, Arnault would stop increasing his stake in Gucci. However, Arnault rejected this proposal. De Sole discovered a loophole that allowed him to issue shares with only board approval, and for every share LVMH bought, he created more for his employees, thus diluting Arnault's stake. The fight dragged on until a settlement in September 2001. After the legal ruling, LVMH sold its shares and realized a profit of $700 million.

In 1998, with businessman Albert Frère, Arnault purchased Château Cheval Blanc in a personal capacity. LVMH acquired Arnault's share in 2009 to add to the group's other wine property Château d'Yquem.

From 1998 to 2001, Arnault invested in a variety of web companies such as Boo.com, Libertysurf, and Zebank through his holding Europatweb. Groupe Arnault also invested in Netflix in 1999.

=== Since 2001: Increasing success and profitability ===
In 2007, Blue Capital announced that Arnault owned jointly with the California property firm Colony Capital 10.69% of France's largest supermarket retailer and the world's second-largest food distributor Carrefour.

In 2008, he entered the yacht business and bought Princess Yachts for 253 million euros. He subsequently took control of Royal van Lent shipyard for an almost identical amount.

From 2010 until 2013, Arnault was a member of the Board of Advisors of the Malaysian 1MDB fund.

On 7 March 2011, Arnault announced the acquisition of 50.4% of family-owned shares of the Italian jeweler Bulgari, to make a tender offer for the rest, which was publicly owned. The transaction was worth $5.2 billion. In 2011, Arnault invested $641 million in establishing LCapitalAsia. On 7 March 2013, National Business Daily reported that mid-priced clothing brand QDA would open stores with the assistance of Arnault's private equity firm LCapitalAsia and Chinese apparel company Xin Hee Co., Ltd. in Beijing. In February 2014, Arnault entered into a joint venture with the Italian fashion brand Marco De Vincenzo, taking a minority 45% stake in the firm. In 2016, LVMH sold DKNY to G-III Apparel Group. In April 2017, Arnault announced the acquisition of Christian Dior haute couture, leather, both men's and women's ready-to-wear, and footwear lines, which integrated the entire Christian Dior brand within LVMH.

By January 2018, Arnault had led the company to record sales of €42.6 billion in 2017, 13% over the previous year, as all divisions turned in strong performances. That same year, the net profit increased by 29%. In November 2019, Arnault planned to acquire Tiffany & Co. for approximately US$16.2 billion. The deal was expected to close by June 2020. LVMH then stated in September 2020 that the takeover would not proceed and that the deal was "invalid" because Tiffany mishandled the business during the COVID-19 pandemic. Subsequently, Tiffany filed suit against LVMH, asking the court to compel the purchase or to assess damages against the defendant; LVMH planned to counter-sue, alleging that mismanagement had invalidated the purchase agreement. In mid-September 2020, a reliable source told Forbes that the reason for Arnault's decision to cancel the Tiffany purchase was purely financial: Tiffany was paying millions in dividends to shareholders despite a financial loss of US$32 million during the pandemic. Upon examination of financial records, Arnault discovered that some US$70 million had already been paid out by Tiffany, with an additional US$70 million scheduled to be paid in November 2020. LVMH filed a counterclaim against the court action commenced by Tiffany; a statement issued by LVMH blamed Tiffany's mismanagement during the pandemic and claimed that it was "burning cash and reporting losses". In late October 2020, Tiffany and LVMH agreed to the original takeover plan, though at a slightly reduced price of nearly $16 billion, a minor reduction of 2.6% from the aforementioned deal. The new deal reduced the amount paid per share by LVMH from the original price of $135 to $131.50. LVMH completed the purchase of Tiffany in January 2021.

Under Arnault's leadership, LVMH has grown to become the largest company by market capitalization in the eurozone, with a record of 313 billion euros ($382 billion) as of May 2021. Arnault has promoted decisions toward decentralizing the group's brands as a business strategy. As a result of these measures, brands under the LVMH umbrella such as Tiffany are still viewed as independent firms with their history.

Arnault has said that brands like Louis Vuitton and Dior are successful because "they have these two aspects, which may be contradictory: They are timeless, [and] they are at the utmost level of modernity."

In November 2024, the Arnault family acquired a majority ownership stake in French football club Paris FC, which was then playing in Ligue 2, the second tier of the French football system. Later that season, the club achieved promotion to Ligue 1 for the first time in 46 years.

== Personal life ==
=== Family ===
In 1973, Arnault married Anne Dewavrin. Together, they had two children, Delphine and Antoine. They separated in 1990. In 1991, he married Hélène Mercier, a Canadian-born concert pianist. They have three sons, Alexandre, Frédéric, and Jean. Arnault and Mercier live in Paris. Arnault has four grandchildren, two from his son Antoine and two from his daughter, Delphine.

All five children—Delphine, Antoine, Alexandre, Frédéric, and Jean—have official roles in brands controlled by Arnault, along with his niece Stephanie Watine Arnault. Alexandre is the EVP of Tiffany & Co., Frédéric is the CEO of LVMH Watches, and Jean is the Director of Watchmaking Marketing and Development at Louis Vuitton. Since 2010, Arnault's daughter Delphine has been with Xavier Niel, a French billionaire businessman active in the telecommunications and technology industry. Effective February 1, 2023, Delphine is the chief executive officer of the luxury brand Dior.

=== Wealth ===
In April 1999, Arnault was first considered to be the richest person in fashion, topping Zara's Amancio Ortega. That same year, he set up Pilinvest (Pilinvest Participations and Pilinvest Investissements), a holding company based in Belgium. Through Pilinvest, Arnault has been holding an 81% stake in Agache (former Groupe Arnault), the holding company that owns 48% of LVMH and 63% of its voting rights. In 2008, he established Protectinvest, a private foundation in Belgium set up to safeguard the integrity of the LVMH group until 2023; the foundation locked up the Arnault children's ability to sell shares in Pilinvest until 2023, by which time Arnault's youngest child turned 25, an age deemed old enough to assume responsibility for LVMH.

In December 2011, six months before Socialist François Hollande took office as President of France, Arnault transferred a 31 percent stake in Groupe Arnault – at the time considered by the newspaper Libération worth €6.5 billion – to Pilinvest.

In 2016, Arnault was paid €7.8 million as the CEO of the LVMH group. In July 2019, Arnault became the second-richest man in the world, with a net worth of $103 billion. Arnault briefly surpassed Jeff Bezos to become the richest person in the world in December 2019, and again for a short time in January 2020. During the COVID-19 pandemic, Arnault saw his wealth shrink by $30 billion as sales of luxury goods plummeted.

On 5 August 2021, Arnault regained the status of the wealthiest man in the world, with his net worth climbing to $198.4 billion. This occurred as sales of LVMH's luxury goods surged in China and other parts of Asia. He is listed as "Bernard Arnault & family" on the Forbes Billionaires list. Forbes estimated the Bernard Arnault & family fortune to be $158 billion in 2022, positioning him ahead of Bill Gates. In 2022, Arnault changed the legal structure of Agache from a Societas Europaea (SE) to a joint-stock partnership to ensure family control over LVMH in the long term.

Arnault and his family had an estimated peak net worth of US$240.7 billion in April 2023, according to Forbes. This made him the richest person in the world at the time, surpassing Elon Musk. Musk would surpass Arnault in June 2023 in net worth with $240 billion, as Arnault's wealth dropped to $190 billion.

According to Bloomberg Billionaires Index Arnault was the wealthiest person in the world, with a net worth of about US $218 billion in May 2024. By 14 June 2024, according to Forbes, Musk had regained first place, with Bezos in second place, and Arnault, with US$194.2 billion, in third place.

=== Request for Belgian citizenship ===
In 2013, it was disclosed that Arnault planned to apply for Belgian citizenship and was considering moving to Belgium. In April 2013, Arnault said that he had been misquoted and that he never intended to leave France: "I repeatedly said that I would stay as a resident in France and that I would continue to pay my taxes... Today, I decided to remove any ambiguity. I withdraw my request for Belgian nationality. Requesting Belgian nationality was to better protect the foundation that I created with the sole purpose of ensuring the continuity and integrity of the LVMH group if I were to die."

On 10 April 2013, Arnault announced he had decided to abandon his application for Belgian citizenship, saying he did not want the move to be misinterpreted as a measure of tax evasion, at a time when France faced economic and social challenges. Arnault also stated several employees requested to leave France for tax purposes but he declined their requests, explaining "the 75% tax would not raise a lot of revenue but should prove less divisive, as now it was set to be levied on firms rather than people, and only due to stay in place for two years."

=== Transport ===
Arnault owned the 70 m (230 ft) converted research vessel Amadeus, which was sold in late 2015. His current 101.5 m (333 ft) yacht Symphony was built in the Netherlands by Feadship.

In October 2022, Arnault stated that LVMH sold its private jet after a Twitter user began to track its flights and stated he began renting private aircraft for his personal and business flights instead. The aircraft was a Bombardier Global 7500 which was registered F-GVMA.

=== Lifestyle ===
Arnault plays tennis weekly, watches his weight, and works continually.

== Art collection ==
Arnault's collection includes works by Picasso, Yves Klein, Henry Moore, and Andy Warhol. He was also instrumental in establishing LVMH as a significant patron of art in France. The LVMH Young Fashion Designer was created as an international competition open to students from fine arts schools. Every year, the winner is awarded a grant to support the creation of the designer's label and a year of mentorship.

From 1999 to 2003, he owned Phillips de Pury & Company, an art auction house, and bought out the first French auctioneer, Tajan. In 2006, Arnault started the building project of the Louis Vuitton Foundation. Dedicated to the creation and contemporary art, the building was designed by the architect Frank Gehry. The Foundation's grand opening at the Jardin d'Acclimatation Paris was held on 20 October 2014.

== Political views ==
In the second round of the 2017 French presidential election, Arnault publicly supported Emmanuel Macron. Macron's wife, Brigitte, was the French teacher of Arnault's sons Frédéric and Jean when they were students at the Lycée Saint-Louis-de-Gonzague. In 2025, he attended the second inauguration of Donald Trump.

Arnault said that Gabriel Zucman was a "far-left activist" who wanted to "destroy the French economy".

== Awards and Honors ==
- Grand Cross of the Légion d'honneur (France, 31 December 2023)
- Commander of the Ordre des Arts et des Lettres (France, 2011)
- Grand Officer of the Order of Merit of the Italian Republic (Italy, 2006)
- Honorary Knight Commander of the Most Excellent Order of the British Empire (United Kingdom, 2012)
- Medal of Pushkin (Russia, 2017)
- The Woodrow Wilson Award for Global Corporate Citizenship (2011)
- The Museum of Modern Art's David Rockefeller Award (March 2014)
- Member of the political economics, statistics and finances section of the Académie des Sciences Morales et Politiques (France, 2024)

== See also ==
- List of French billionaires by net worth
