= Bruno Peltre =

French classical pianist

Bruno Peltre is a French pianist whose performance career was suddenly stopped by a health problem in 2001.

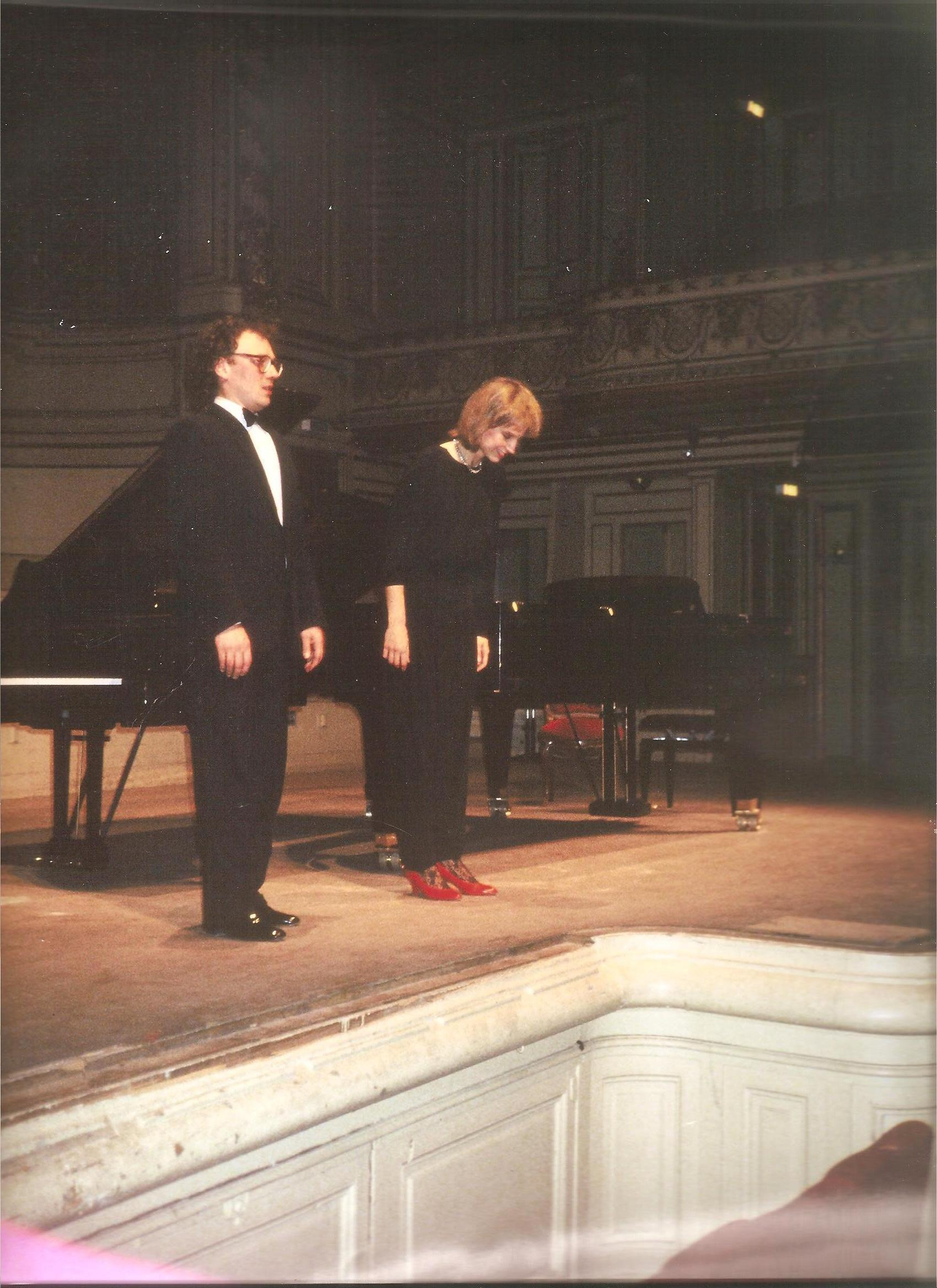
Bruno Peltre's concert with Hélène Mercier at Salle Gaveau, 1988

== Biography ==
Born in Nancy, he was awarded the 1st prize of the conservatory in 1972 and was a student of François Cholé, partner of Georges Enesco, professor of Michel Béroff. During his time as a law student, he started studying at the Conservatoire national supérieur de musique et de danse de Paris in the class of Yvonne Loriod in 1974 and was awarded the 1st piano prize in 1977. In 1978, in Germaine Mounier's class, he was awarded the jury's unanimity for his Licence de concert at the Ecole normale de musique Alfred Cortot in Paris. He is influenced by Enrique Barenboim and Maria Courcio Diamond in London, by Leon Fleisher in Toronto and by Yevgeni Malinin.

He was selected from 1980 to 1990 to participate in international competitions in Salt Lake City, Senigalia, Pretoria, Viña del Mar, Tchaikovsky in Moscow, Budapest and Belgrade. He received awards from the Yehudi Mehudin Foundation, the Georgy Cziffra Foundation, Crédit Lyonnais, and a gold medal from the Soloists of Bordeaux.

He gave recitals on important stages both in France and abroad such as Salle Pleyel in 1992, Salle Gaveau (from 1977 to 1995), Salle Cortot, Opéra Garnier on Vladimir Horowitz's piano for AROP, at théâtre du Rond Point, at Automobile Club de France in 2000, in Liege, Berlin at the Tacheles, Karlsruhe; Budapest, Belgrade, Arsenal de Metz (1998), Cincinnati (1994), Columbia University in New York (1994-1995), Los Angeles. He recorded a live concert at Salle Pleyel. He also played at Théâtre de l'Odéon to record and compose the piano part of the Chanson de la Petite Rivière in the Album Les Naives of CharElie Couture. He was invited to play as a soloist at Radio France by François Serette, Eve Ruggiéri, Anne-Marie Réby (En blanc et noir) - Arielle Buteau (at Démons de Midi) – for France 3 – for Arte at Berlin – for Radio-suisse romande Espace 2 with Tedi Papavrami – at Radio France Festival and Montpellier – at Riom Festival – at Entrecasteaux Festival – at Festival of Roman Churches in Berry – at Flâneries musicales in Reims (1998) – on Mermoz boat by Croisières Paquet (from 1987 to 1995) – at Festival Clavier d'hivers- Festival of the Kingdom of Navarra – at Grandes étapes françaises – Festival Chopin de Bagatelle – Festival of Danube Trieste – Fêtes romantiques de Nohant with Quatuor Elysée – Rencontres Frédéric Chopin with Macha Méril (Corse, 1998) - Festival Bilkent University ANKARA – Opera orchestra with director Ernst von Donaniy in Wozzek – Ensemble 2e2m – orchestra of Istanbul with director Éric Bergel – orchestra Bernard Thomas – orchestra Jean Walter Audoli – orchestra of Nancy with director Jérôme Kaltenbach. His partners were or have been Quatuor Élysée, Quatuor Anton, Tedi Papavrami, Macha Méril, Geneviève Page, Leslie Caron, Hussein Sermet, Dominique de Williencourt, Yves Henry, Hélène Mercier-Arnault. He has been the director, since 1995, of the Académie festival des Musicales d'Ajaccio.

He is a piano professor at the conservatory of the 6th district of Paris. In 2012, Bertrand Delanoë (Mayor of Paris) and Claude Evin (former minister for Public Health) invited him to give a concert in the private rooms of the Paris City Hall to support the Association France AVC (fighting against strokes) with the help of Agence régionale de santé (national agency organising public health in the Region Ile-de-France).

He is the brother of Christine Peltre, author of numerous books dealing with orientalism and a professor at Strasbourg University.

== Notes ==
- Concert for supporting the Association France AVC [archive] l'ARS Île-de-France
