= Delphine Arnault =

French businesswoman (born 1975)

- Born: Delphine Caroline Marie Arnault; 4 April 1975 (age 51); Neuilly-sur-Seine, France
- Spouse: Alessandro Vallarino Gancia (m. 2005; div. 2010)
- Partner: Xavier Niel (2010–present)
- Children: 4
- Father: Bernard Arnault
- Relatives: Antoine Arnault (brother); Frédéric Arnault (half-brother)

Delphine Caroline Marie Arnault (French: [dɛlfin aʁno]; born 4 April 1975) is a French businesswoman who has been the chairperson and chief executive officer of Christian Dior Couture since February 2023.

Arnault is the daughter of Bernard Arnault. She is a director of LVMH and has been an executive vice president of Louis Vuitton since 2013.

== Early life ==
She is the eldest child of Bernard Arnault from his first wife, Anne Dewavrin. She has a younger brother, Antoine Arnault, as well as three half-brothers from her father's second marriage, including Frédéric Arnault.

Between the ages of seven and ten, Arnault and her family lived in New Rochelle, New York, where she and her brother attended a French-American school. She later earned degrees from the London School of Economics and EDHEC Business School (Ecole des Hautes Etudes Commerciales du Nord).

In 1994, she was presented as a debutante at Le Bal des débutantes in Paris.

== Career ==
Arnault began her career working at McKinsey & Company for two years. She joined LVMH in 2000, initially working with Dior creative director John Galliano's own label.

Since 2003, Arnault has been a member of the management board of the LVMH group, the first woman and youngest person to occupy that post. She is also a member of the board of directors for Moët Hennessy and M6, as well as a managing partner of a wealth management company.

In 2008, Arnault was named deputy chief of the designer Christian Dior Couture, which she quit in 2013 to join Louis Vuitton as a director and executive vice president.

In May 2014, Arnault started the LVMH Prize, an international competition for young fashion designers. The objective of the LVMH group is to discover the talents and creativity of new designers – "It is necessary to recognize the talent and creativity, as well as the ways in which we can best help the growth of their business", she confirmed.

In January 2023, Arnault was appointed as CEO of Christian Dior Couture, effective in February. She was ranked 45th on Fortune's list of Most Powerful Women in 2023.

== Other directorships ==
- Gagosian Gallery, member of the board of directors (since 2021)
- 20th Century Fox, member of the board of directors (since 2013)
- Céline, member of the board of directors (since 2011)
- Pucci, member of the board of directors (since 2007)
- Loewe, member of the board of directors (since 2002)
- Ferrari, member of the board of directors
- Havas, member of the board of directors (2013–2019)

== Political activities ==
On 1 December 2022, Arnault was among the guests invited to the state dinner hosted by American president Joe Biden in honor of French president Emmanuel Macron at the White House.

At the second inauguration of Donald Trump in January 2025, Arnault attended the church service with Trump at St. John's Episcopal Church.

== Personal life ==
Arnault married Alessandro Vallarino Gancia, heir to the Italian winemaker Gancia, on 24 September 2005. They divorced in 2010.

Arnault has four children – two daughters born 2010 and 2012, and two sons born 2013 and 2017. Her two children with French businessman Xavier Niel, she has briefly mentioned in an interview with Vogue, are named Elise and Joseph. The family resides in the 16th arrondissement of Paris.
