= Frédéric Arnault =

French businessman (born 1994)

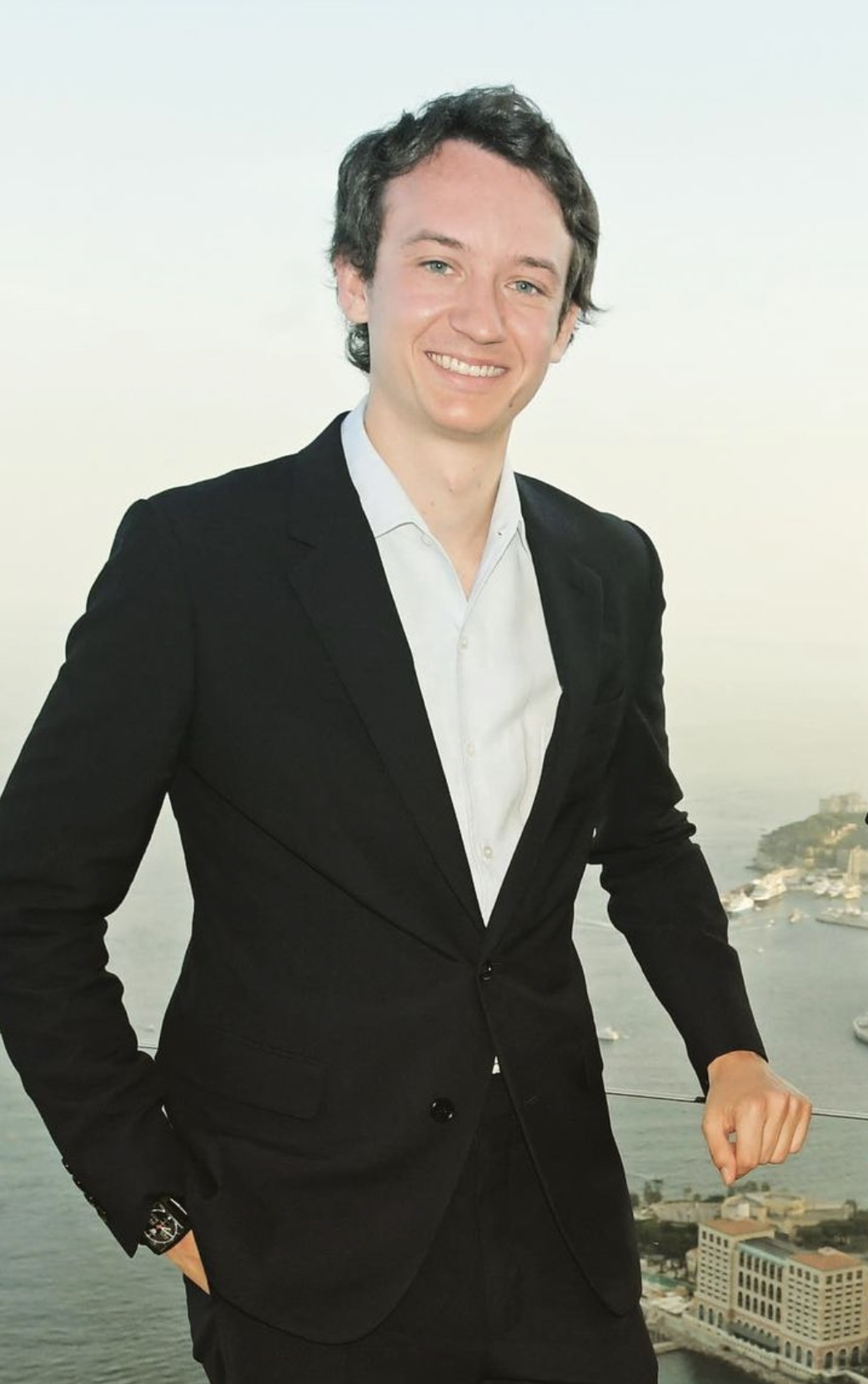
- Arnault in 2022
- Born: Frédéric Bernard Jean Étienne Arnault; 7 November 1994 (age 31); Neuilly-sur-Seine, France
- Education: Lycée Louis-Le-Grand, École polytechnique
- Occupation: Businessman
- Title: CEO of Loro Piana
- Parents: Bernard Arnault (father); Hélène Mercier-Arnault (mother)
- Relatives: Antoine Arnault (half-brother); Delphine Arnault (half-sister)

Frédéric Bernard Jean Étienne Arnault (French pronunciation: [fʁedeʁik aʁno]; born 7 November 1994) is a French businessman who has been the CEO of Loro Piana since 2025. He is the second son of billionaire Bernard Arnault and his wife, Hélène Mercier-Arnault.

== Life ==
Frédéric Bernard Jean Étienne Arnault was born in Neuilly-sur-Seine, France, the second son of Bernard Arnault and his second wife, French-Canadian pianist Hélène Mercier (b. 1959). He has two brothers, Alexandre Arnault and Jean Arnault, and is the half-brother of Delphine Arnault and Antoine Arnault.

In 2017, he graduated from École Polytechnique with a degree in applied mathematics and computer science.

Arnault has been an amateur pianist since his youth. He performed some concerts.

In addition to speaking French and English, he is fluent in German and Italian.

== Career ==
Arnault began his career with internships at McKinsey and at Facebook’s artificial intelligence research center. In 2018, he began working at LVMH as strategy and digital director at TAG Heuer. In 2020, he was appointed CEO of the brand. He launched a renewal of the brand's image by focusing on innovation and technological development and initiated repositioning efforts toward the high-end segment. Under his leadership, the company strengthened its direct retail network and recorded significant revenue growth.

In January 2024, he was appointed the CEO of LVMH Watches, which includes the brands TAG Heuer, Hublot and Zenith; he also became a member of the board of directors of the LVMH group and deputy CEO of Financière Agache. In March 2025, he was named the CEO of Italian luxury label Loro Piana, with the role starting in June.
