= Hélène Mercier-Arnault =

Canadian-born classical pianist (born 1960)

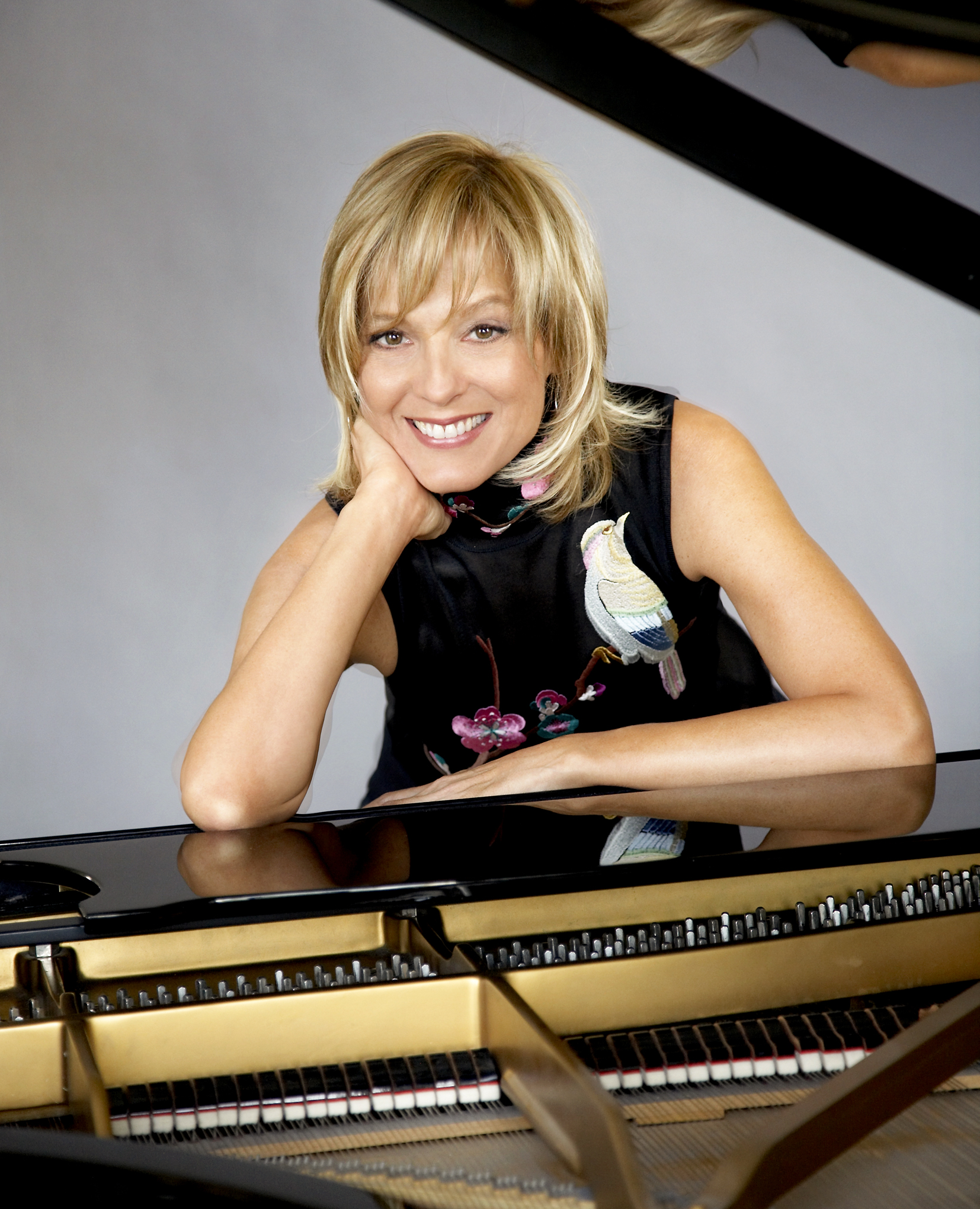
- Born: Hélène Mercier; 5 February 1960 (age 66); Montreal, Quebec, Canada
- Education: Vienna Academy of Music; Juilliard School; Conservatoire national supérieur de musique et de danse de Paris
- Occupation: Classical pianist
- Spouse: Bernard Arnault (m. 1991)
- Children: 3, including Frédéric Arnault

Hélène Mercier-Arnault (French: [mɛʁsje]; née Mercier, born on 5 February 1960), is a Canadian concert pianist who has performed regularly in Europe and North America as a soloist and chamber musician.

== Biography ==
Hélène Mercier is the daughter of François Mercier, a lawyer, and Lucile Mercier (born Rouleau), a real estate agent. She began her musical studies at the age of six at Vincent-d'Indy School of Music in Outremont, Canada. At the age of 15, she entered the Vienna Academy of Music. She then studied at the Juilliard School with Sasha Gorodnitski. She continued her studies with Pierre Sancan of the Conservatoire national supérieur de musique et de danse de Paris.

=== Musical career ===
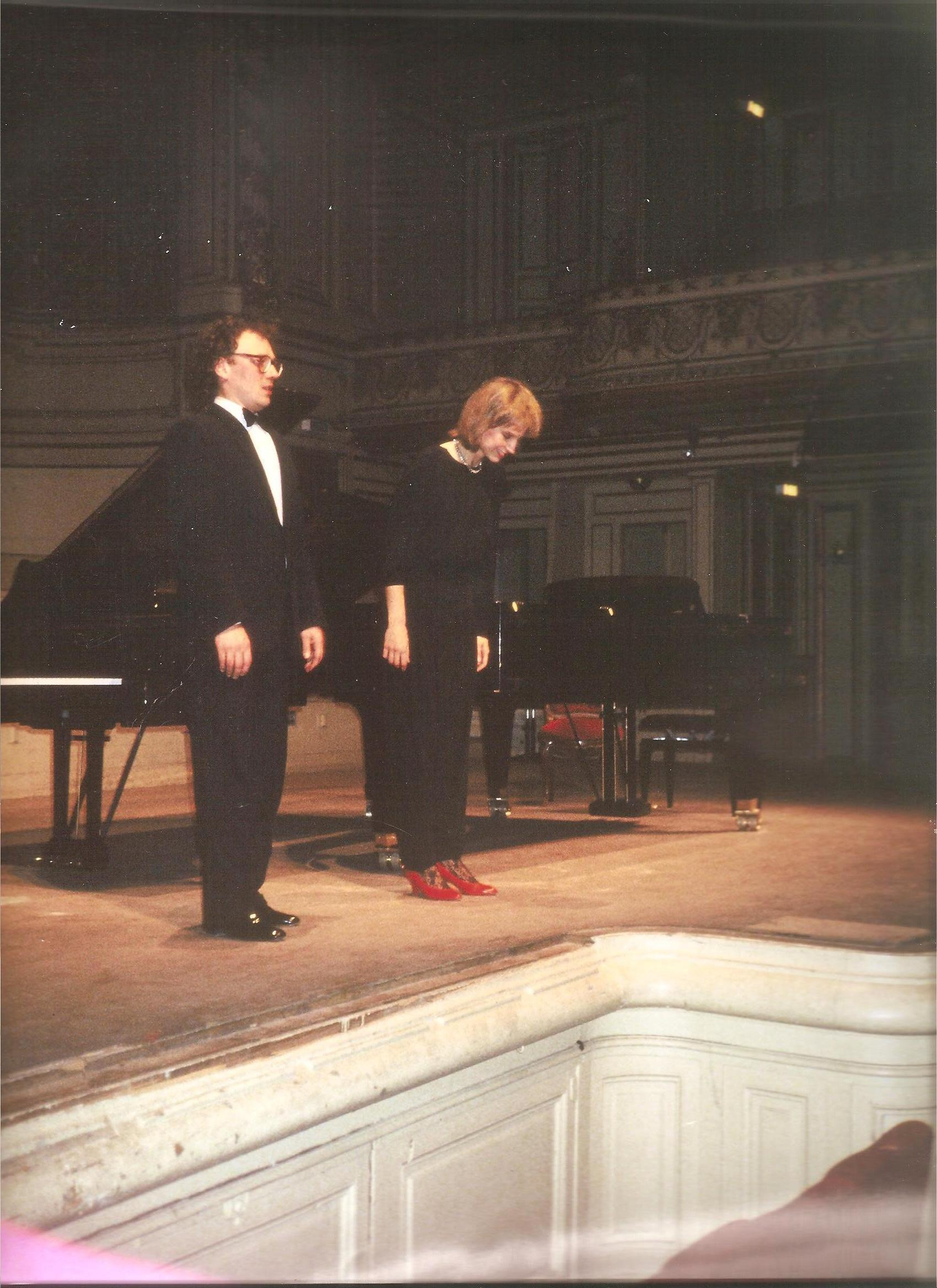
Concert at Salle Gaveau by Hélène Mercier-Arnault and Bruno Peltre in 1988

She has been invited to play with several European and North American orchestras, including the Prague Philharmonia, the RAI National Symphony Orchestra, the Monte-Carlo Philharmonic Orchestra, the Minnesota Orchestra and the Fort Worth Symphony Orchestra. In Paris, she has played under the direction of Zubin Mehta with the Israel Philharmonic Orchestra and under the direction of Kurt Masur at the Théâtre des Champs-Élysées. She has also performed with the Russian National Orchestra and the Russian National Philharmonic Orchestra under the direction of Vladimir Spivakov and in Canada with the orchestras of Vancouver, Toronto, Ottawa and Montreal under the direction of Charles Dutoit, Trevor Pinnock and Long Yu. She performed in recital with cellist Mstislav Rostropovich in Copenhagen and Paris.

In Japan, she performed with the New Japan Philharmonic under the direction of Seiji Ozawa.

She has also performed with violinists Renaud Capuçon, Ivry Gitlis, Laurent Korcia and cellists Gautier Capuçon, Henri Demarquette and Truls Mork. She has played two pianos with Boris Berezovsky, Frank Braley, Brigitte Engerer, Cyprien Katsaris and Louis Lortie.

Mercier appeared alongside Brigitte Macron in a Snapchat video published by the French-Malian singer Aya Nakamura in April 2024, which showed the group enjoying a meal and dancing in a restaurant, which subsequently went viral.

=== Recordings ===
In partnership with Canadian pianist Louis Lortie, she released several recordings for Chandos Records, which earned the Diapason d'Or.

With the violinist Vladimir Spivakov, she recorded a disc dedicated to Ernest Chausson, under the Capriccio label. This recording received the "Choc" label from Le Monde de la Musique.

With Cyprien Katsaris, she recorded a disc of works by Schumann and Brahms as well as an album under the Warner Classics label with Brahms' Hungarian Dances and Waltzes.

=== Personal life ===
In October 1990, Mercier met businessman Bernard Arnault at a friend's home. They married on 23 September 1991 and have three sons, including Frédéric Arnault.

=== Decoration ===
- Knight of the Order of Arts and Letters
