= Trogneux =

Trogneux is a French surname. It may refer to:

== People with the surname ==
- Alain Trogneux (born 1955), French local historian
- Brigitte Trogneux, later known as Brigitte Macron, First Lady of France

== Other ==
- Fontaine Trogneux, later known as Fontaine de Charonne, historic fountain in Paris, France
- Jean Trogneux, French chocolatier, run by five generations of the Trogneux family in Amiens
