= Gueudet =

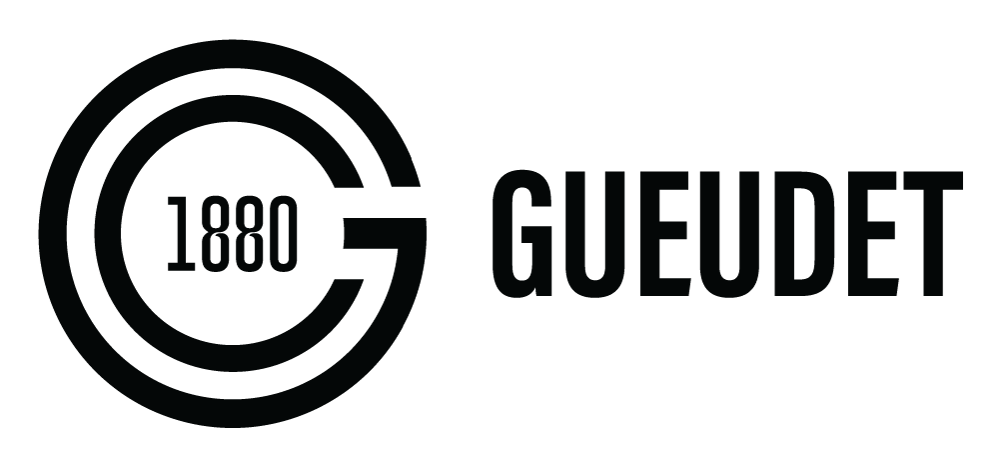
- Type: Privately held company
- Industry: Distribution
- Founded: 1880
- Founder: Charles Gueudet
- Headquarters: Amiens, France
- Number of locations: more than 200 dealerships
- Area served: Europe
- Key people: Gustave Gueudet, Lucien Gueudet, Robert Gueudet, Jean-Claude Gueudet, Patrick Gueudet
- Products: Vehicles and Equipment
- Revenue: ▲€2.1 billion (2019)
- Owner: Gueudet family (100%)
- Number of employees: ▲4,100 (2020)
- Parent: Automotive Parts and Services Group SAS, Gueudet Frères SA
- Website: www.gueudet.fr

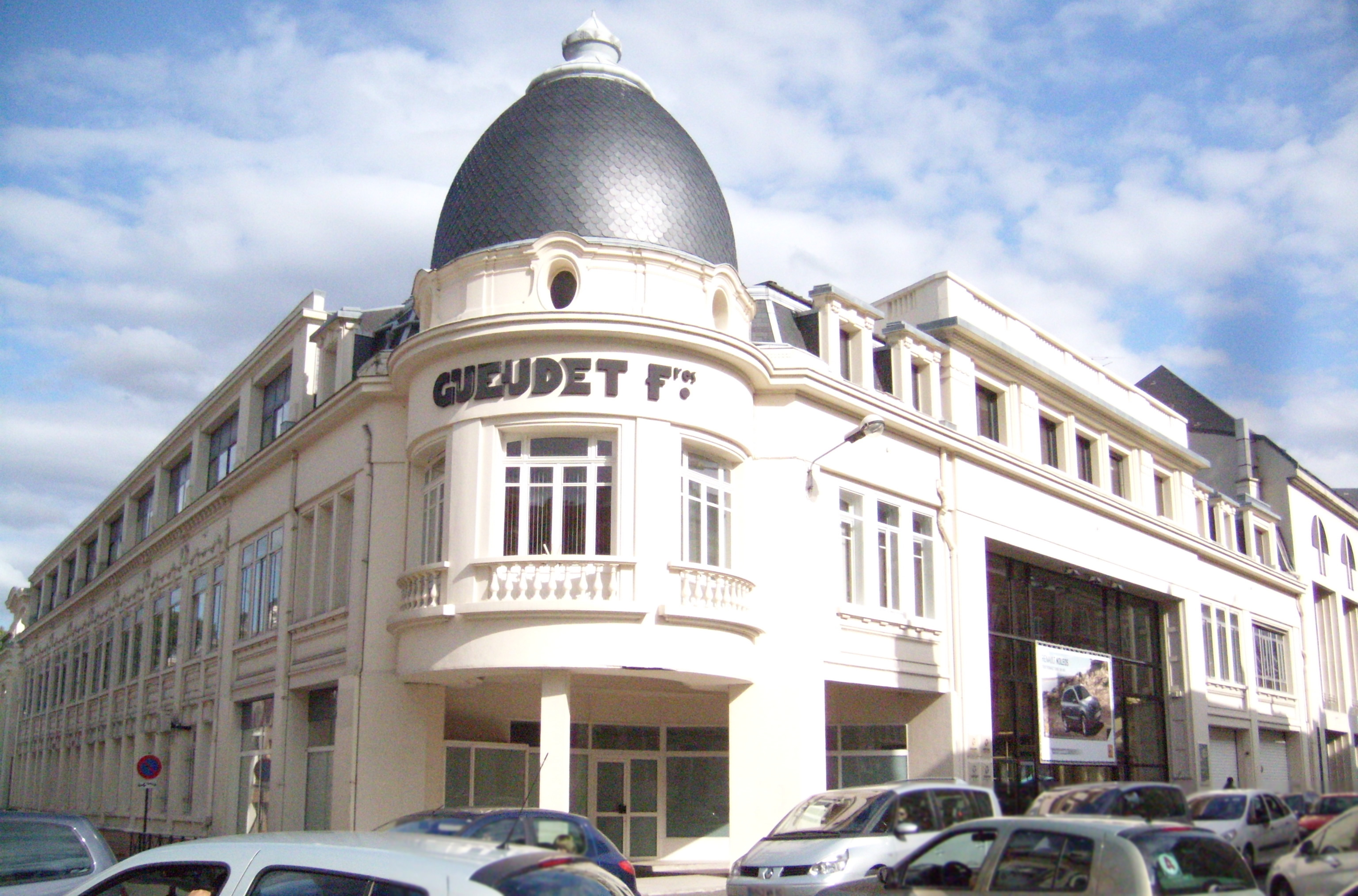
Historical headquarter of Gueudet Frères SA in Amiens. The building was commissioned by Gustave and Lucien Gueudet and inaugurated in 1922.

Gueudet is the second most important car distributor in France and one of the most important in Europe. It is owned and managed by the Gueudet family.

== History ==
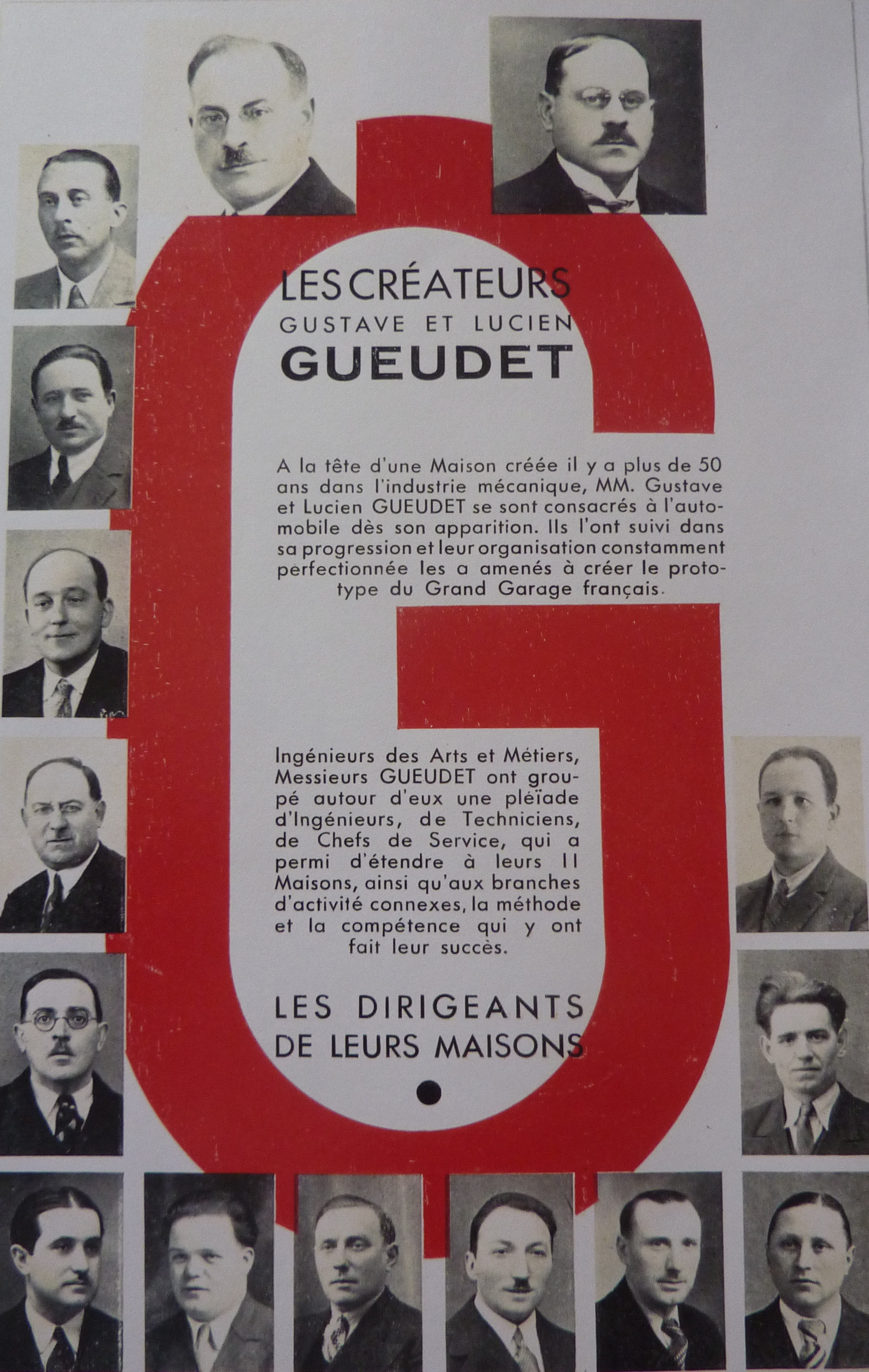
Gustave Gueudet, Knight of the Legion of Honour, and Lucien Gueudet invested in the automobile sector before 1920

All started with Charles Gueudet who was manufacturing sewing-machines and bicycles in his workshop in Breteuil-sur-Noye, France. Charles created his company in 1880 and soon worked with two of his sons, Gustave and Lucien. Gustave Gueudet is a self-made man with an entrepreneurial spirit while his brother Lucien is an engineer who graduated from the prestigious French school of Arts et Métiers. When the first cars appear, the Gueudet brothers quickly understand that this will revolutionize the world, and they decide to invest massively in a car business after Gustave Gueudet and car maker Louis Renault, founder and CEO of Renault, met on a road of northern France while Mr. Renault had some mechanical problems that were fixed by Gustave Gueudet himself. The two men who then kept in touch soon decided to do business together.

In any event, Gustave Gueudet and Louis Renault sign their first distribution contract in 1920. At the time, Gustave is committed to sell four cars a year. He and Lucien Gueudet decide to create a true network of garages and distribution centers throughout northern France. In 1922, they inaugurate in Amiens Le Palais de l'Automobile, which is then considered as a great example of what a nice and modern garage should be.

Throughout the years, the Gueudet brothers make their company more and more prosperous, but World War II occurs and most of the garages and dealerships owned by the family are destroyed. After the War, Gustave and Lucien Gueudet decide to start almost all over again with the help of Gustave's son, Robert, born in 1910. In addition, they expand the business to new activities, such as people transportation with the creation of two companies called Les Autobus Artésiens, and Les Courriers Automobiles Picards. Also, the Gueudets get involved in agricultural materials, trucks, buses, and gas distribution.

The Gueudet Group becomes one of the most important companies in its field, regionally, but also nationally. In 1956, Gustave Gueudet is decorated Knight of the Legion of Honour by the French Government. In 1959, Gueudet organizes the first tractor race in the country.

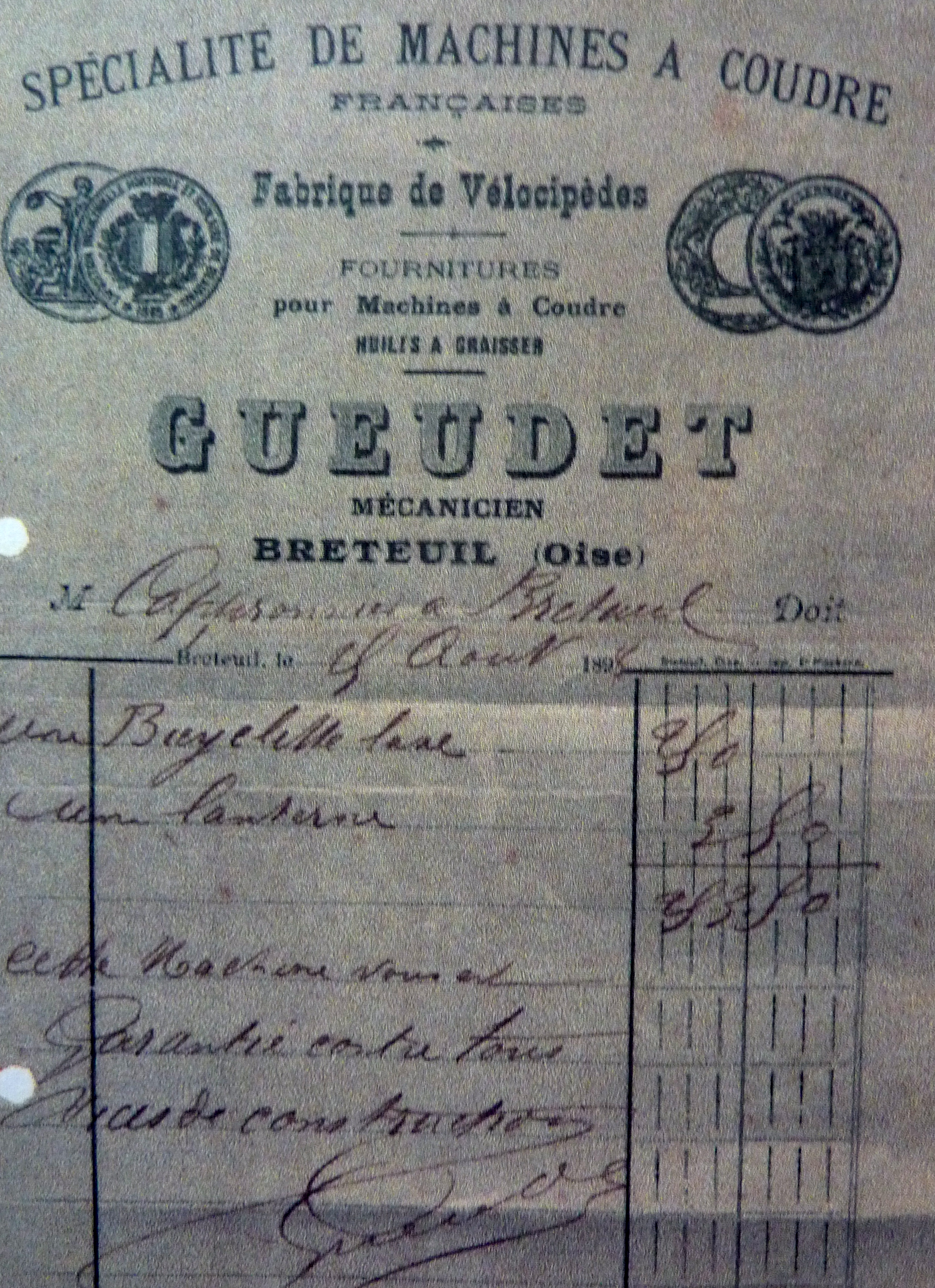
Gueudet started by making and selling sewing machines.

In 1960, the Gueudet Group is divided into two parts. The first part contains the car distribution activities and all that goes with it, and is owned and managed by Gustave Gueudet and his son Robert Gueudet, while the second part contains the transportation activities and is owned and managed by Lucien Gueudet and his son-in-law Pierre Amiaud, an engineer from the Ecole Centrale des Arts et Manufactures.

In 1966, Robert Gueudet dies at only 55 years old and lets his father Gustave, then 85, alone as the head of the company. Gustave Gueudet has to rethink his succession plan and designates a general manager from outside of the family. Gustave dies 4 years later in the French Riviera at age 89, after having dedicated all his life to the development and the prosperity of the family business he transformed and took to a leading position.

After a transition period, two of Robert Gueudet's sons, Jean-Claude and Patrick, became heads of the Gueudet Group in 1980. The two brothers continue to develop the business and besides Renault become partners of other car manufacturers, such as BMW, Opel (at the time owned by GM), Nissan, Toyota, Audi, Volkswagen, and Mini. At some point, the family group becomes the third car distributor in France in terms of turnover, and the first group that is 100% family-owned. Meanwhile, Patrick Gueudet, a graduate of HEC Lausanne Business School in Switzerland, creates several computer programs related to car distribution, which help to improve customer service quite significantly. One of those programs is even sold to Diac, Renault's financial company. As a result, the Gueudet Group is seen in France as a real computer pioneer. Similarly, the company is the first of its kind to create its own website as early as 1995.

In 1992, the Compagnie financière d'organisation et de gestion (CFOG) is created and remains the main holding of the group until 2005.

By order of the President of the French Republic Jacques Chirac, Patrick Gueudet, like his grandfather almost fifty years earlier, is named Knight of the Legion of Honour on 31 December 2004. On 9 March 2005, he is decorated by an advisor to Jacques Chirac during a private ceremony in Paris.

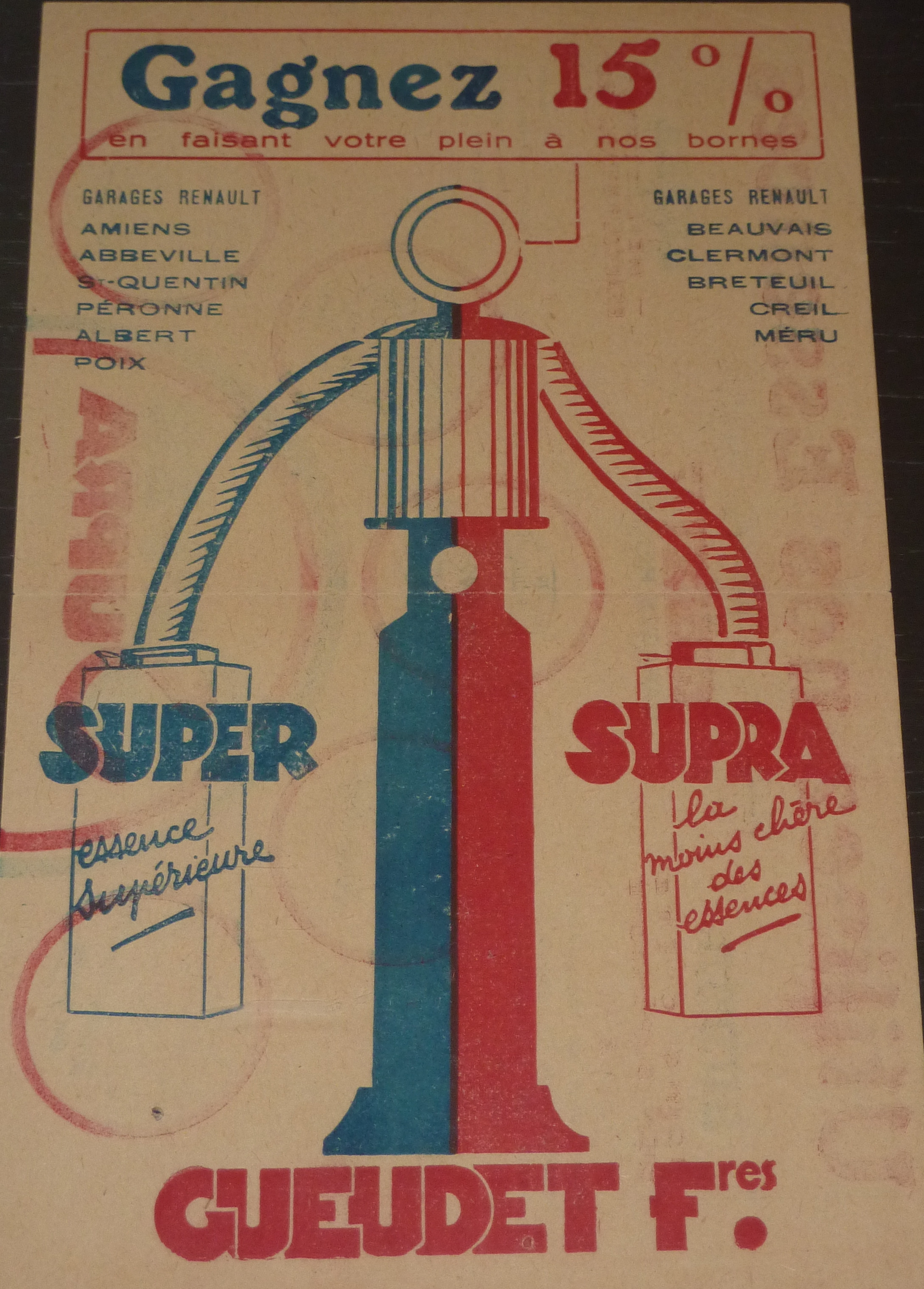
Advertising for the fuel and gas division of the Gueudet Group in the 1950s

In 2011, the group acquires new Renault and Dacia dealerships in the Rhône-Alpes region of France.

In 2012, Gueudet decides to stop distributing Audi. In 2014, Gueudet continues to purchase new car dealerships in Normandy and to consolidate its position of second biggest car dealer of France with 160 dealerships. Gueudet is ranked among the 500 wealthiest families of France.

In 2017, it is announced that Gueudet will distribute Alpine in Deauville.

In February 2018, Automotive Parts and Services Group, the Gueudet Group holding company, announces that it is in the process of acquiring Groupe Métin, which distributes Peugeot, Citroën, DS, Kia, Audi, Volkswagen, Seat and Skoda in the Paris area and employs about 1,000 people. The transaction is confirmed in March 2018, making Gueudet a group of 1.8 billion turnover and 3,800 employees. Later in the year, Gueudet announces that it is acquiring Citroën and DS dealerships from groupe Vincent in the Paris area.

== The Gueudet Family ==
=== Charles Gueudet (1852–1928) ===
Born on 23 February 1852 in Troussencourt, France, and deceased in 1928. In 1880, he founded the Gueudet company as a bicycle and sewing machine maker. The business was then also known as Gueudet-Huré, Huré being the maiden name of Charles's wife, Marie. The bicycles were manufactured and sold under the brand "La Gauloise" whereas the sewing machines were manufactured and sold under the brand "Gueudet".

=== Gustave Gueudet (1880–1970) ===
Son of Charles Gueudet and Marie (née Huré). Born on 10 December 1880 in Bagnolet, France, and deceased on 20 March 1970 in Nice, France. Knight of the Legion of Honour. Gustave signed a contract with Louis Renault in 1920 and became the first Renault distributor. He then developed what became the Gueudet Group. Married to Adèle Alexandre (1890–1964), he had two children, a son Robert (1910–1966), and a daughter Simonne (1913–1917).

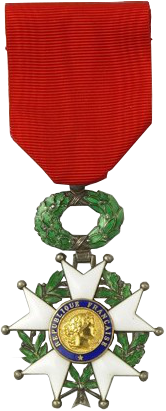
Both Gustave Gueudet and Patrick Gueudet received the Legion of Honour

=== Lucien Gueudet (1886–1970) ===
Son of Charles Gueudet and Marie (née Huré). Born on 30 October 1886 in Breteuil-sur-Noye, France, and deceased on 7 May 1970 in Paris 17. Married to Jeanne Toulet (1895–1985), he had a daughter Renée.

=== Robert Gueudet (1910–1966) ===
Son of Gustave Gueudet and Adèle (née Alexandre). Born on 20 November 1910 in Breteuil-sur-Noye, France, and deceased on 30 March 1966 in Amiens, France. Robert studied at Collège Sainte-Barbe in Paris and attended the Ecole Spéciale des Travaux Publics. He quickly joined his father to work for and develop the Gueudet Group. Simultaneously, he got involved in various professional organizations such as the Chambre syndicale nationale du commerce et de la réparation automobile (CSNCRA) and the Groupement des Concessionnaires Renault (GCR). Robert married Arlette Vigot on 25 April 1939 in the Church of Saint-Sulpice in Paris, before a reception held at Hotel George V. The couple had five children: Jean-Claude (1940), Patrick (1942), Michèle (born and deceased in 1945), Denis (1947), Carole (1951).

=== Mrs. Robert Gueudet (1919–2012) ===
Arlette Gueudet (née Vigot). Born on 24 June 1919 in Paris 6th arrondissement, and deceased on 14 December 2012 in Paris 16th arrondissement. Daughter of Paul Vigot, a Parisian publisher specializing in medical books through the Vigot publishing company located in Saint-Germain-des-Près, Captain in the French Army, Knight of the Legion of Honour, Croix de guerre 1914–1918. Arlette's mother, Colette (née Hérold), was from a family of French artists (the composer Ferdinand Hérold) and politicians (the minister Ferdinand Hérold). Arlette Gueudet was a widow at age 45 and became President of Gueudet Frères, which she remained until the 1990s. In 1995, she was awarded the Médaille de la Famille française at the Hotel de Ville de Paris. She died at her domicile of avenue Henri-Martin in Paris after a brief hospitalization at the American Hospital of Paris. She is buried at cimetière de Passy in the 16th arrondissement of Paris.

=== Jean-Claude Gueudet (1940) ===
Son of Robert Gueudet and Arlette (née Vigot). Born on 3 November 1940. Married to Monique Trogneux, daughter of Jean Trogneux and sister of Brigitte Macron, Emmanuel Macron's wife. He became CEO of Gueudet Frères in 1980 and is the current Chairman of the Gueudet Group Holding.

=== Patrick Gueudet (1942) ===
Son of Robert Gueudet and Arlette (née Vigot). Born on 24 July 1942. Knight of the Legion of Honour. Patrick graduated from HEC Lausanne in Switzerland and joined the Gueudet Group shortly after. He became CEO of Gueudet Frères in 1980 and chairman and CEO of the Gueudet Group Holding from 1992 until 2005.
