= Laurence Auzière-Jourdan =

French cardiologist (born 1977)

- Born: Laurence Christine Alexandra Auzière; 1977 (age 48–49); Amiens, France
- Education: Pierre and Marie Curie University
- Occupation: Cardiologist
- Spouse: Guillaume Jourdan (m. 2005; div. 2021)
- Children: 3
- Parent(s): André-Louis Auzière; Brigitte Macron
- Relatives: Emmanuel Macron (stepfather)

Laurence Auzière-Jourdan (née Auzière; born 1977) is a French cardiologist.

== Early life and education ==
Auzière-Jourdan was born in 1977 to André-Louis Auzière, a banker, and his wife Brigitte (née Trogneux) a teacher. Her family lived in Truchtersheim, a French city near the German border, until 1991. She was a classmate of Emmanuel Macron at the Lycée la Providence in Amiens, France. Macron's parents first thought that their son Emmanuel was interested in Auzière-Jourdan after she remarked that there was a boy in her class who "knows everything about everything". However, Emmanuel Macron eventually married Auzière-Jourdan's mother, Brigitte Trogneux, in 2007; they had first met when Macron was a 15-year-old student in Trogneux's drama class.

Auzière-Jourdan graduated from Pierre and Marie Curie University (UPMC University of Paris VI) and completed her thesis of exercise, Facteurs échographiques associés à un niveau de BNP élevé chez les insuffisants cardiaques: interaction systole diastole, in 2004. She has an older brother, Sébastien, an engineer, and a younger sister, Tiphaine, a lawyer.

== Career ==
Auzière-Jourdan practices high-risk cardiology and vascular diseases in Vincennes and Nogent-sur-Marne. She practices with cardiologists Didier Catuli and Pierre Sablon.

== Political activity ==
She campaigned for her stepfather and ex-classmate Emmanuel Macron during the 2017 presidential election.

== Personal life ==
She married Guillaume Jourdan, a radiologist practicing in Meaux. They have three children. They divorced in 2021.
