= Fontaine Palatine =

Fountain in Paris, France

Coordinates: 48°51′00.05″N 02°20′09.22″E

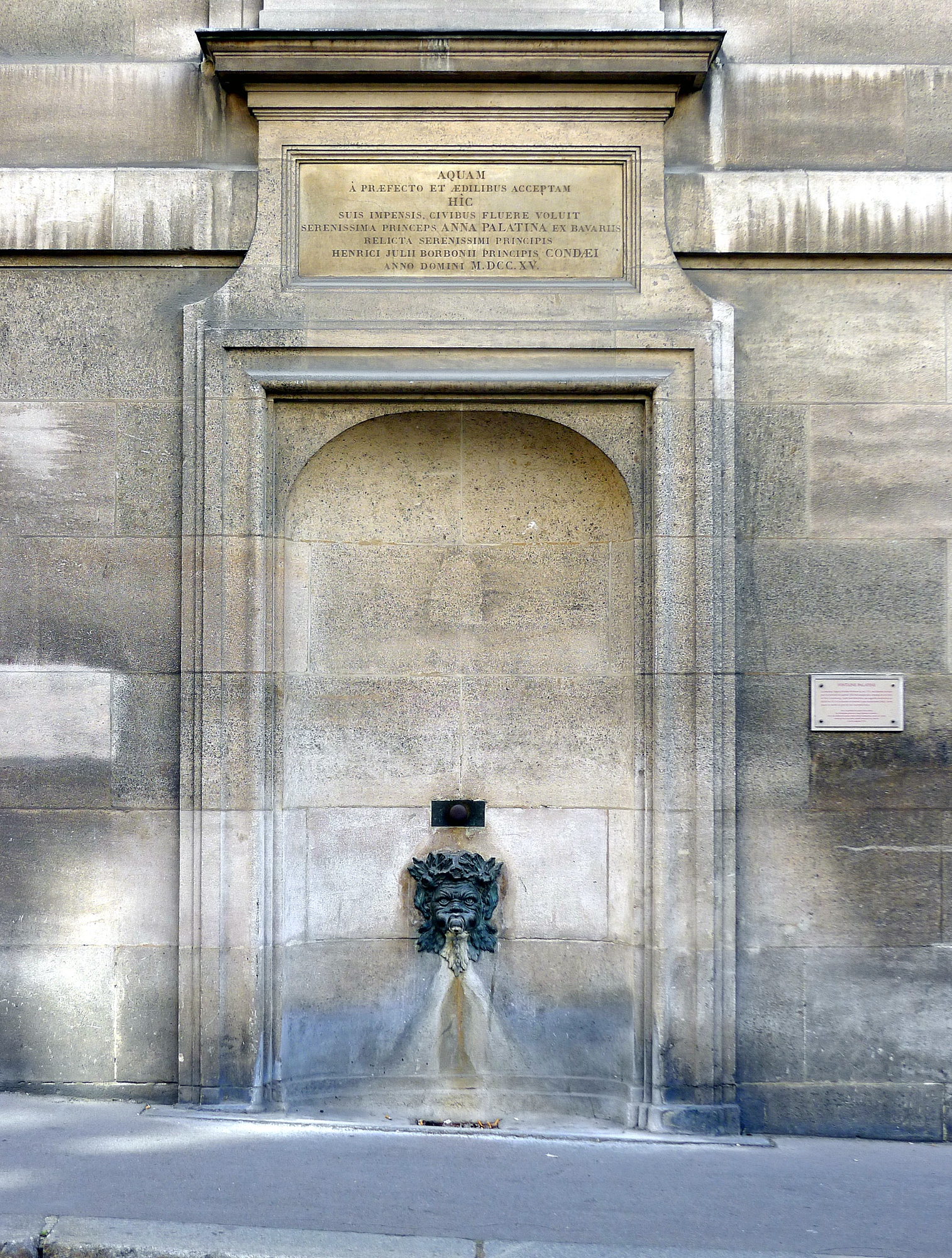
La fontaine Palatine

The fontaine Palatine is a fountain in Paris located at 12 rue Garancière, in the 6th arrondissement, near the Luxembourg Palace and Luxembourg Garden.

== History ==
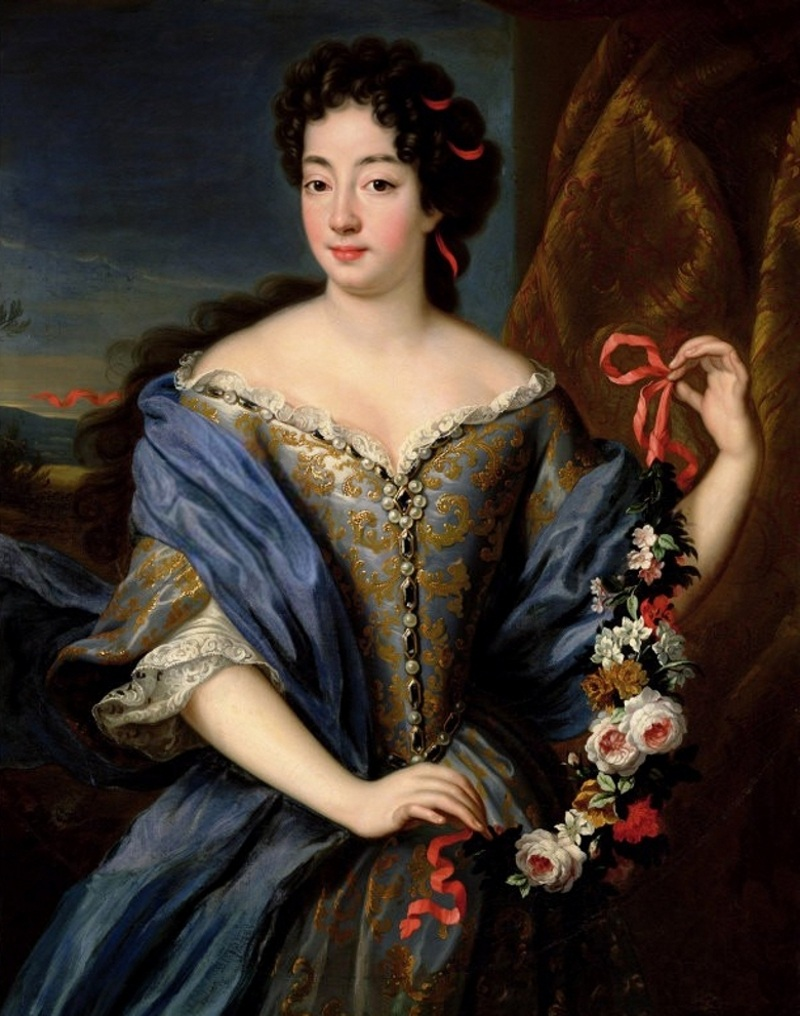
Anne of Bavaria.

The fountain was built by Anne Henriette of Bavaria (1648–1723), against the wall of the commons of her residence, as a gift to the people of the neighborhood. She was Princess of Palatinate-Simmern by birth, and by marriage was Princess of Condé, the widow of Henri Jules, Prince of Condé. The fountain's waterworks were probably designed by Jean Beausire, the chief of public works and designer of fountains for Louis XIV and Louis XV. When the commons were destroyed and a new building was constructed in 1913, the fountain was preserved and attached to the wall of the new building, in its original location. It was declared an historical monument of France in 1962.

== Description ==
The fountain is a simple niche in the wall the size of a door, with little decoration. Over the niche is a plaque with an inscription in Latin of the dedication of the fountain. Below it is a bronze mascaron of a head of a lion, through which the water flowed.

- The inscription reads, in Latin:

AQUAM
A PRAEFECTO ET AEDILIBUS ACCEPTAM
HIC
SUIS IMPENSIS, CIVIBUS FLUERE VOLUIT
SERENISSIMA PRINCEPS ANNA PALATINA EX BAVARII
RELICTA SERENISSIMI PRINCIPI
HENRICI JULII BORBONII PRINCIPIS CONDAEI
ANNO DOMINI MD.CC.XV

With the agreement
of the Prefect and the civic authorities
The Serene Princess Anne Palatine de Bavière
widow of the Serene Prince Henri-Jules de Bourbon, Prince de Condé,
wishes that water will flow, at her expense, for the citizens.

The Year of Our Lord 1715.

== Bibliography ==
- Marie-Hélène Levadé and Hugues Marcouyeau, Les fontaines de Paris : l'eau pour le plaisir - Paris, 2008 - ISBN 9782915345056
- Daniel Rabreau, Paris et ses fontaines - Paris, 1997 - ISBN 9782905118806
- Daniel Rabreau, editor, Les fontaines de Paris, de la Renaissance à nos jours - Paris, 1995 - ISBN 2-9051-1881-4
