= Paul Bucher =

French egyptologist (1887–1966)

Paul Émile Bucher
- Born: May 16, 1887; Guebwiller
- Died: May 23, 1966 (aged 79); Guebwiller
- Occupations: Egyptologist, clergyman

Paul Émile Bucher (16 May 1887 – 23 May 1966) was a 20th-century French Egyptologist and clergyman.

He worked in the Valley of the Kings, where he deciphered and published inscriptions on the walls of the tombs KV34 (Thutmose III) and KV35 (Amenhotep II).

== Early life ==
Paul Bucher was born on 16 May 1887 in Guebwiller to Joseph Bucher, an accounting manager for Oberelsasses, and Anne-Marie Martz. He attended the local gymnasium school and graduated in July 1908. He attended the Grand Seminary of Strasbourg in late 1908 and was ordained as a priest on 25 July 1913. During World War I, he worked as an ambulance driver.

== Career ==
=== Egyptologist ===
Bucher studied Semitic languages, particularly Arabic and Assyrian, and Egyptology at the Imperial University and Institute of Egyptology in Strasbourg. He received a doctorate in philology in 1917, relating to work on papyri 2 and 7 from the National Library of France.

In late 1927, he moved to Egypt after receiving a scholarship at the French Institute of Archaelogy in Cairo. He worked in Luxor and the northern region of the Nile Delta. In 1930-1931, he published papers on the texts from the tombs of Thutmose II, Amenhotep II and Seti I.

From 1929 or 1930, he worked in Tanis, and was particularly interested in mud-brick walls, called Toub-Naï in Arabic. In February 1940, he helped to excavate the silver coffin of Pharaoh Psusennes.

After World War II, he worked to gather the remains of the Museum of Egyptology's collection.

From 1948, he lectured on Egyptology at the University of Strasbourg.

=== Clergyman ===
He first served as a priest in Eschau from 19 September 1913, then in Sainte-Madeleine in Strasbourg from 16 November 1918. He was the parish priest at Avenheim near Truchtersheim for 40 years, between 1 September 1923 and 1 July 1964. He was a priest for 53 years and retired at age 77.

== Death ==
After his retirement, he returned to Guebwiller, where he died on 23 May 1966, aged 80, after a short illness. His funeral was held in Guebwiller.

== Publications ==
- Les Textes des Tombes de Thoutmosis III et d'Aménophis II, MIFAO (Memoirs published by the members of the Institut Français d'Archéologie Orientale), volume 60, Cairo, 1932, 222 pages.
- Les textes à la fin des première, deuxième et troisième heures du livre "de ce qu'il y a dans la Douat". Textes comparés des tombes de Thoutmosis III, Aménophis II and Séti Ier, Institut français d'archéologie orientale, 1931, 247 pages.
- Les hymnes à Sobk-Ra, seigneur de Smenou, des papyrus n°2 and 7 de la Bibliothèque nationale de Strasbourg, P. Geuthner, 1930, 50 pages.
- with Pierre Montet, Un dieu cananéen à Tanis : Houroun de Ramsès, Numéro 2 de Revue biblique, J. Gabalda, 1935, 165 pages.
- Les Commencements des Psaumes LI to XCIII: Inscription d'une tombe de Ḳaṣr eṣ Ṣaijād
