= Pfettisheim =

- Part of Truchtersheim
- Coat of arms
- Location of Pfettisheim
- Location within France Location within Grand Est
- Coordinates: 48°39′39″N 7°38′48″E
- Country: France
- Region: Grand Est
- Department: Bas-Rhin
- Arrondissement: Saverne
- Canton: Bouxwiller
- Commune: Truchtersheim
- Area^{1}: 4.84 km^{2} (1.87 sq mi)
- Highest elevation: 185 m (607 ft)
- Lowest elevation: 148 m (486 ft)
- Population (2022): 921
  - Density: 190/km^{2} (493/sq mi)
- Time zone: UTC+01:00 (CET)
  - Summer (DST): UTC+02:00 (CEST)
- Postal code: 67370
- ^{1} French Land Register data, which excludes lakes, ponds, glaciers > 1 km^{2} (0.386 sq mi or 247 acres) and river estuaries.

Pfettisheim (Alsatian: Pfetze) is a former commune in the Bas-Rhin department in north-eastern France. On 1 January 2016, it was merged into the commune Truchtersheim.

== See also ==
- Communes of the Bas-Rhin department
