= Fontaine de l'Abbaye de Saint-Germain-des-Prés =

Fountain in Paris, France

Coordinates: 48°50′52″N 2°21′01″E

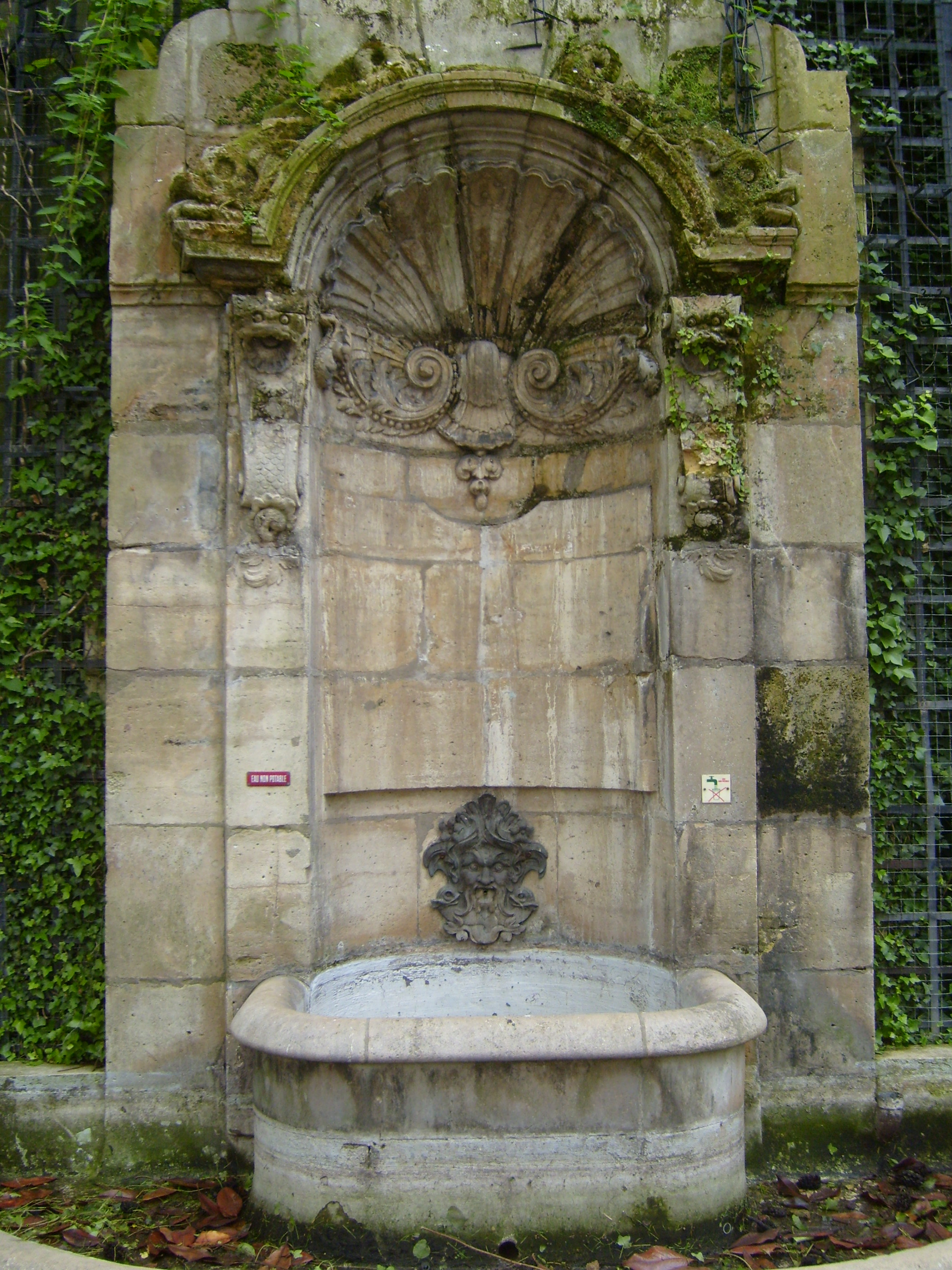
Fontaine de L'Abbaye de Saint-Germain-des-Pres, (1714-1717).

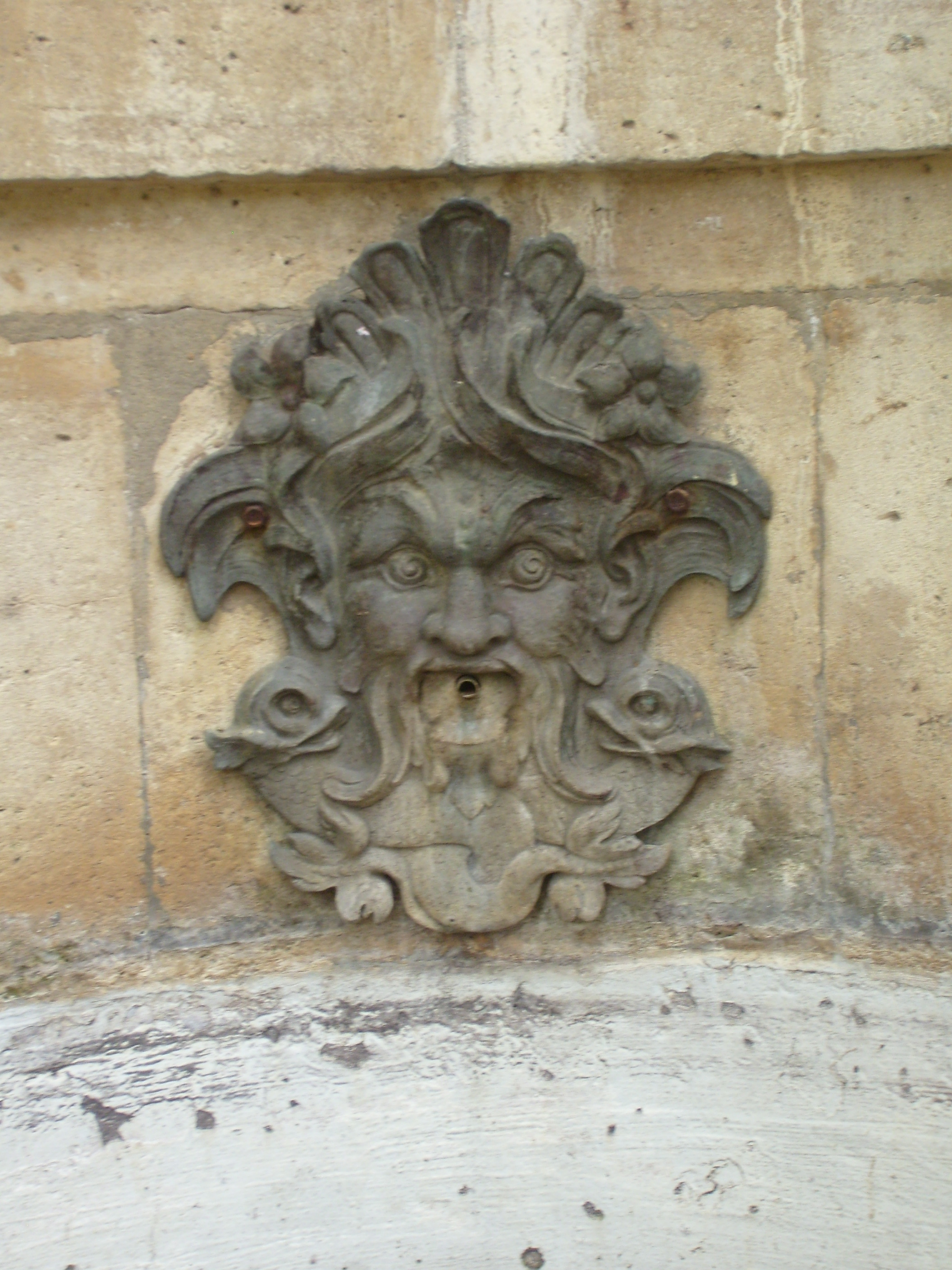
Masqueron of the Fontaine de l'Abbaye de Saint-Germain-des-Pres (1714-1717)

The Fontaine de l'Abbaye de Saint-Germain-des-Prés (French pronunciation: [fɔ̃tɛn də labei də sɛ̃ ʒɛʁmɛ̃ de pʁe]) is a fountain constructed in 1715-1717, at the end of the reign of King Louis XIV and the beginning of the reign of Louis XV, to provide drinking water in the neighborhood near the church of Saint Germain-des-Prés, in the 6th arrondissement of Paris. It was originally located at the corner of the Rue Sainte-Marguerite (now rue Gozlin) and Rue Childebert. The fountain mechanics were designed by Jean Beausire, the chief of public works and fountain-maker for Louis XIV, who built more than twenty fountains in Paris between 1684 and 1740. The architect was Victor-Thierry Dailly, who in 1715 was commissioned to build a group of houses and the fountain around the parvis of the Church of Saint-Germain-des-Pres.

In the middle of the 19th century, the construction of Boulevard Saint-Germain by Baron Haussmann required the destruction of the site where the fountain was located. The fountain was moved to Place Langevin in the 5th arrondissement, against the wall of the old Ecole Polytechnique, where it can be seen today.

== Bibliography ==
- Paris et ses fontaines, de la Renaissance à nos jours, texts assembled by Dominque Massounie, Pauline-Prevost-Marcilhacy and Daniel Rabreau, Délegation a l'action artistique de la Ville de Paris. from the Collection Paris et son Patrimoine, directed by Beatrice de Andia. Paris, 1995.(ISBN 2-9051-1881-4)
- Michel Gallet, Les Architectes parisiens du XVIIIe - Dictionnaire biographique et critique, Paris, Éditions Mengès, 1995,(ISBN 2-8562-0370-1)
