= Fontaine Maubuée =

Coordinates: 48°51′39.76″N 2°21′4.66″E

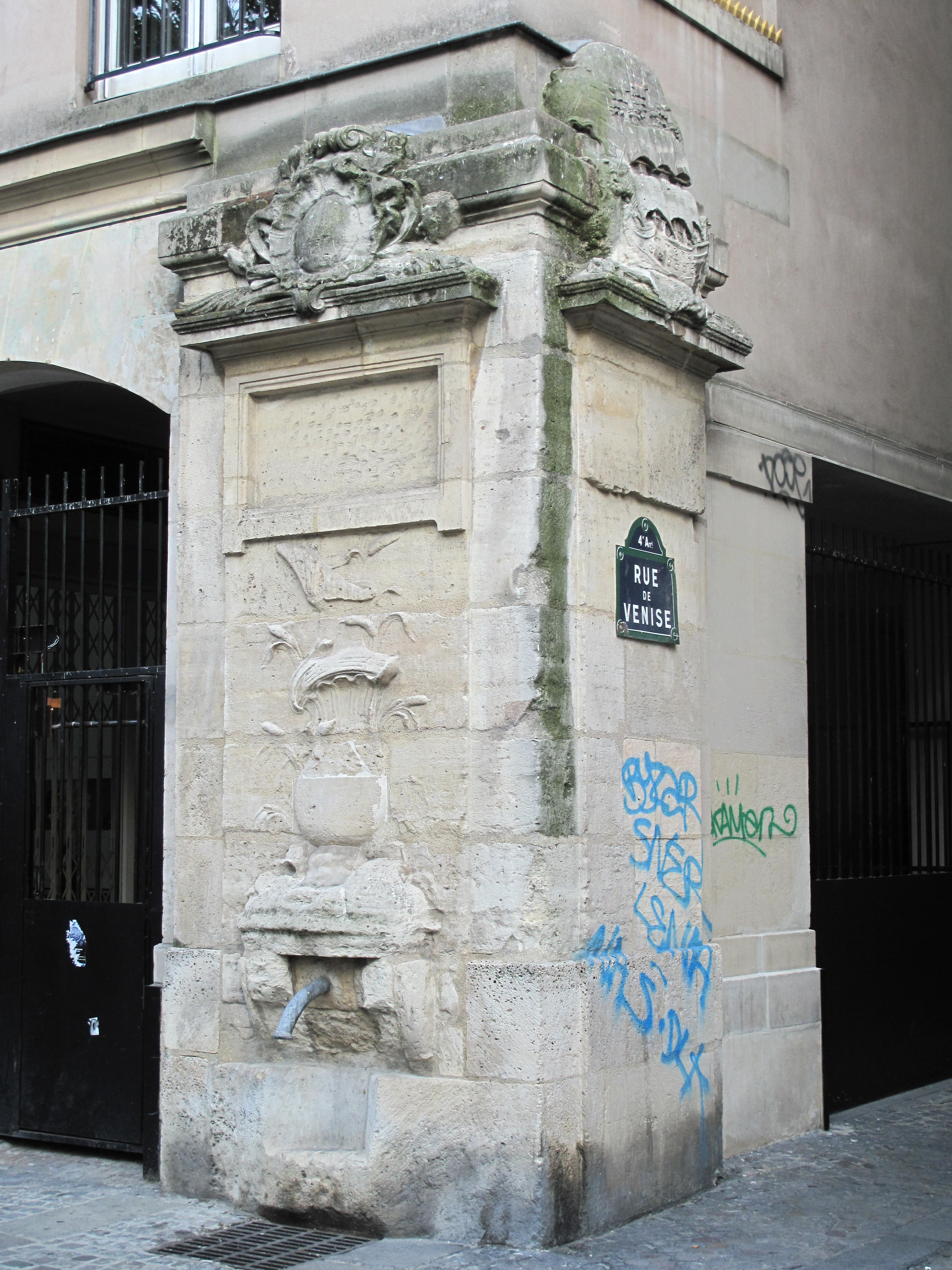
The Fontaine Maubuée (1733)

The Fontaine Maubuée is an 18th-century water fountain located at the corner of rue Saint-Martin and rue Venise in the 4th arrondissement of Paris. The fountain was originally at the corner of the rue Saint-Martin and the rue Maubuée. The site was originally occupied by one of the oldest fountains in Paris, which had been built in 1392 by King Charles VI of France. The name of the fountain referred to the either the bad vapors (mauvaise buée) or the bad washing, because of the poor quality of the water coming to the fountain from the springs of Belleville.

The present fountain was built by Jean Beausire and his son, Jean-Baptiste Augustin, in 1733. It is decorated with a bas-relief representing a rocaille vase, surrounded with roses and water plants. The fountain was dismantled and moved to its present location in 1937.

The older fountain on the site was the subject of a poem by François Villon.

== Bibliography ==
- Philippe Krief, Paris Rive Droite, Petites histoires et grands secrets, Massin, Paris 2004, ISBN 2-7072-0488-9
- Paris et ses Fontaines, de la Renaissance a nos jours, Collection Paris et son patrimoine, directed by Beatrice de Andia.
