= Alain Trogneux =

French teacher and local historian (born 1955)

Alain Trogneux (born 25 December 1955) is a French teacher and local historian. He is a history professor in Amiens, and the author of several books about the local history of Picardy.

== Early life ==
Alain Trogneux was born on 25 December 1955.

== Career ==
Trogneux worked for the archives of the Somme in 1992.

Trogneux is a history professor for Classe préparatoire aux grandes écoles at the Lycée Louis-Thuillier in Amiens. He is also a corresponding member of the Institute of Contemporary History at the French National Center for Scientific Research.

Trogneux is the author of several books about the history of Amiens and Picardy. He has also published articles about the Algerian War in Paris Match.

== Works ==
- Couvret, Anne-Marie; Lochmann, Xavier; Trogneux, Alain (1991). Cent fois sur le métier : le textile dans la Somme de la Révolution à la guerre de 1914. Amiens: Centre culturel de la Somme. OCLC 463883073.
- Trogneux, Alain (1991). Amiens entre deux guerres : fêtes, spectacles et distractions. Amiens: Encrage. ISBN 9782906389298. OCLC 28150276.
- Trogneux, Alain (1997). Amiens, années 50 : De la Libération à la Ve République. Amiens: Encrage. ISBN 9782906389830. OCLC 416976178.
- Trogneux, Alain (2000). Amiens, années 60 : naissance d'une capitale régionale. Amiens: Encrage. ISBN 9782911576256. OCLC 47655833.
- Trogneux, Alain (2004). Dictionnaire des élus de Picardie. Tome 1, La Somme. Amiens: Encrage. ISBN 9782911576515. OCLC 469872182.
- Trogneux, Alain (2007). Dictionnaire des élus de Picardie. Tome 2, L' Oise. Amiens: Encrage. ISBN 9782911576720. OCLC 643055718.
- Trogneux, Alain (2010). Dictionnaire des élus de Picardie. Tome 3, L'Aisne. Amiens: Encrage. ISBN 9782911576997. OCLC 607612075.
- Trogneux, Alain (2014). Amiens, années 70 : la fin des Trente glorieuses. Amiens: Encrage. ISBN 9782360580408. OCLC 902789894.
