= Fontaine de Charonne =

Fountain in Paris, France

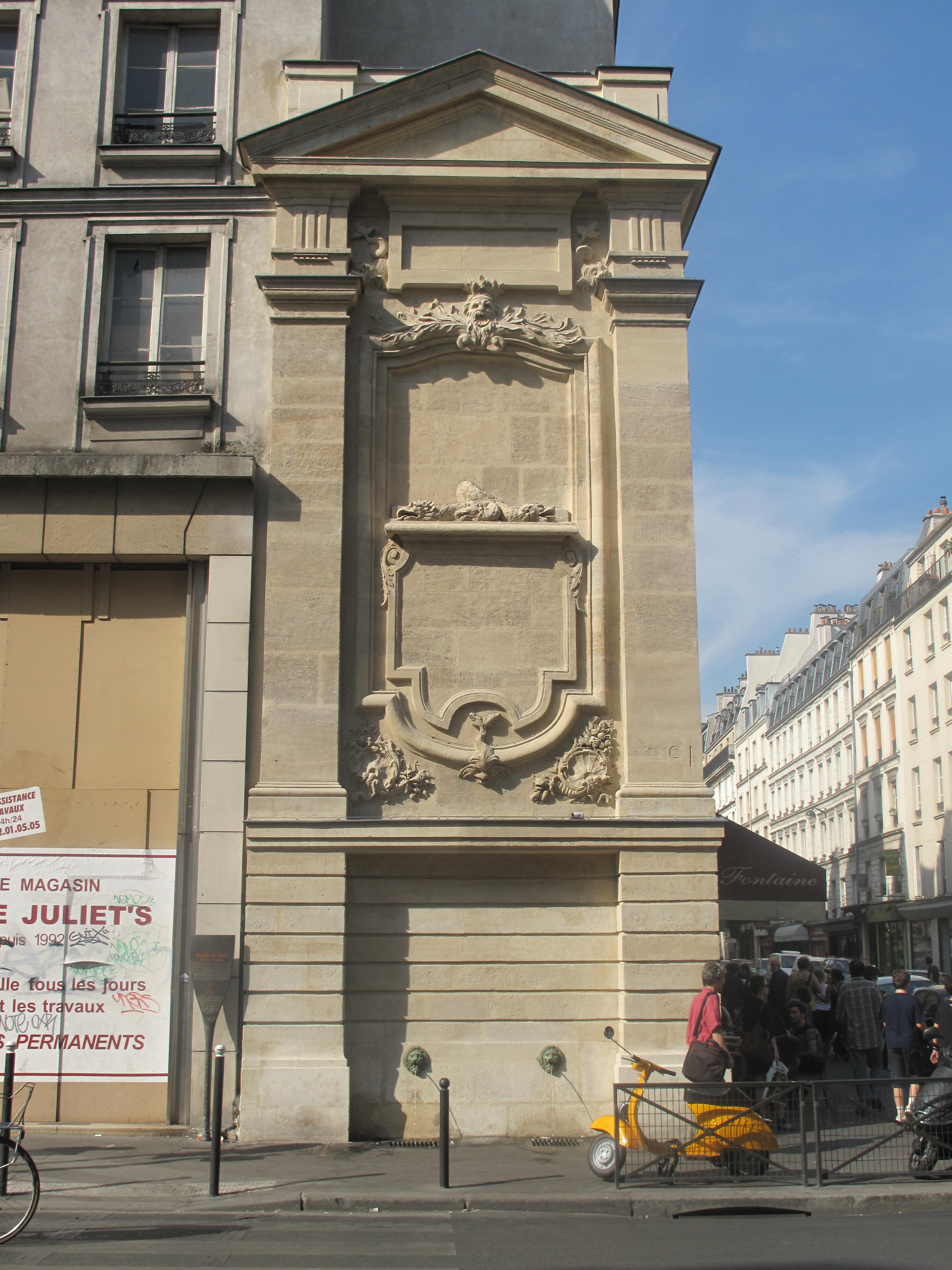
- Fontaine de Charonne
- Interactive map of Fontaine de Charonne
- Location: Corner of rue du Faubourg-Saint-Antoine and rue de Charonne, Paris, France
- Coordinates: 48°51′07″N 2°22′25″E
- Built: 1719–1724
- Architect: Jean Beausire

Monument historique
- Official name: Fontaine dite Trogneux, puis de Charonne
- Designated: 1995
- Reference no.: PA00086558

The Fontaine de Charonne, formerly known as Fontaine Trogneux, is a historic fountain in Paris, France.

== Location ==
The fountain is located on the corner of rue du Faubourg-Saint-Antoine and rue de Charonne.

== History ==
The fountain was built from 1719 to 1724 for the inhabitants of Faubourg Saint-Antoine to have access to water. It was designed by architect Jean Beausire. It was named after Mr. Trogneux, a brewer who lived in the neighbourhood.

The fountain was refurbished from 1806 to 1810, and it was restored in 1963.

== Architectural significance ==
It has been listed as a national historical monument since 1995.
