= Jean Beausire =

French architect (1651–1743)

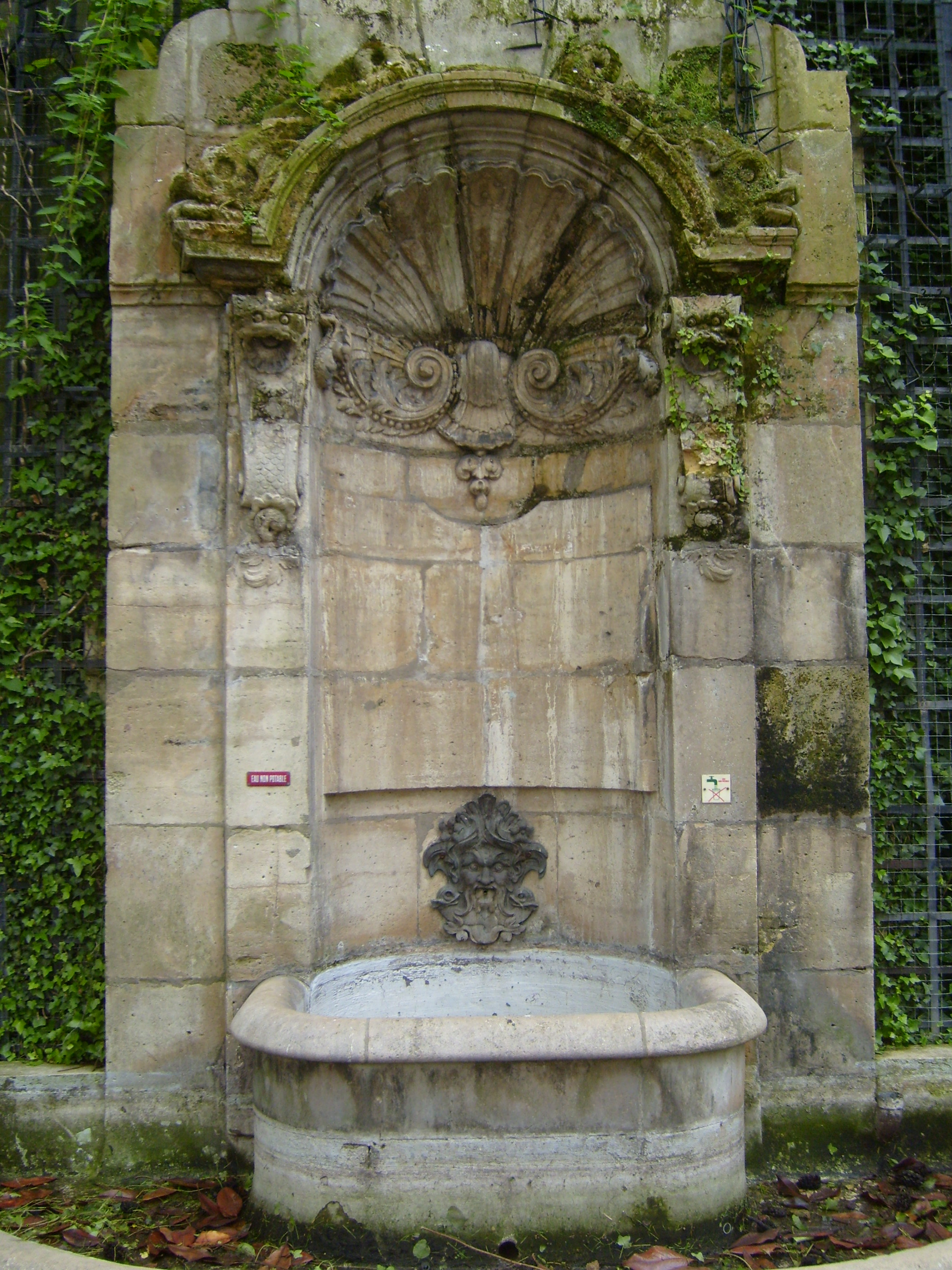
Fontaine de L'Abbaye de Saint-Germain-des-Pres, (1714-1717).

Jean Beausire (French pronunciation: [ʒɑ̃ boziʁ]; 26 February 1651 - 20 March 1743) was a French architect, engineer and fountain-maker and the chief of public works in Paris for Kings Louis XIV and Louis XV between 1684 and 1740, and was the architect of all the public fountains constructed in Paris that period. Several of his fountains still exist and continue to work. Three streets in the 4th arrondissement of Paris today carry his name: Rue Jean-Beausire, Impasse Jean-Beausire, and Passage Jean-Beausire.

== Biography ==
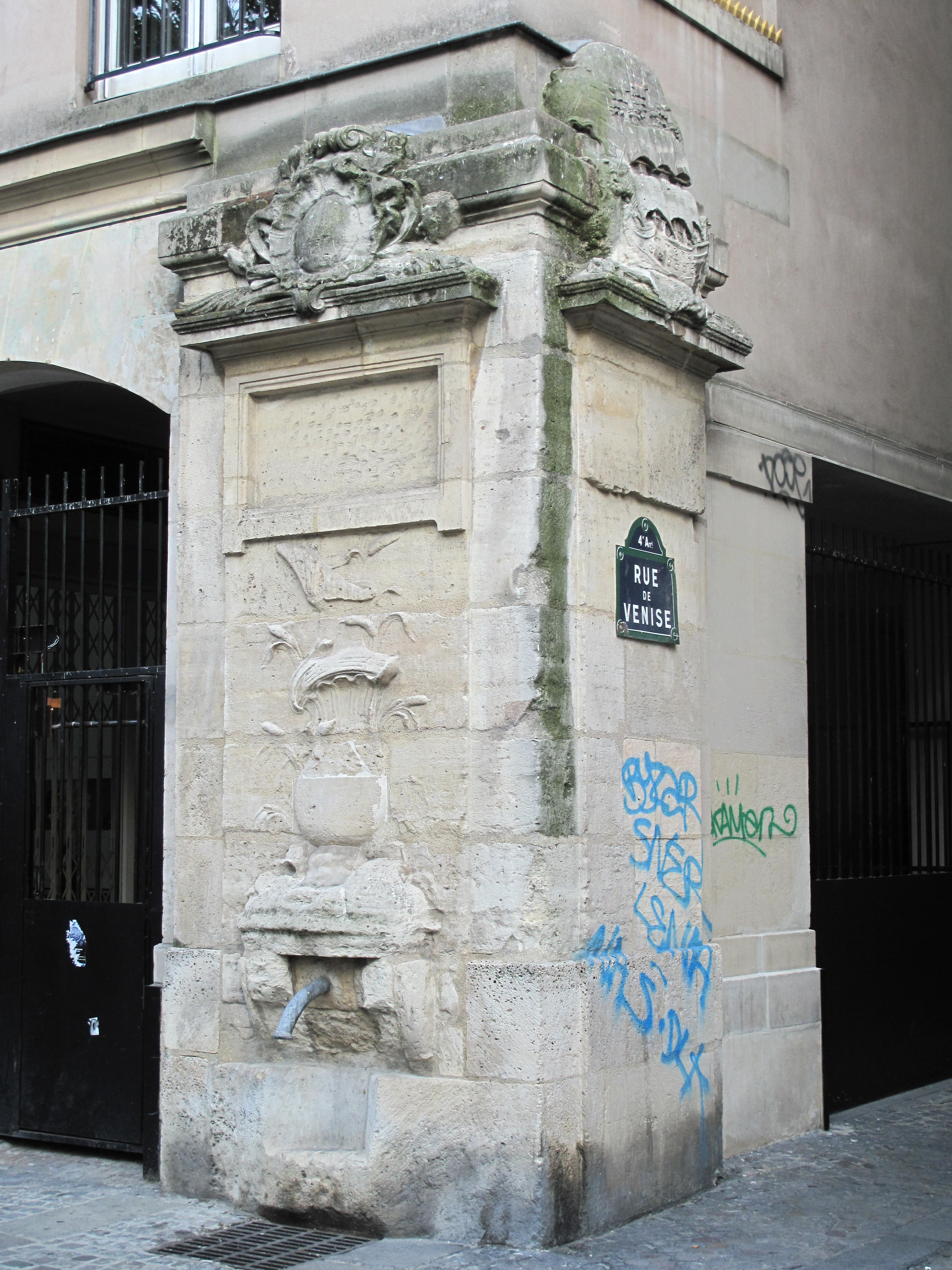
The Fontaine Maubuée (1733)

Jean Beausire was born on 26 February 1651. His father was a stonemason, and the family lived in the St. Severin quarter of Paris. He married Marie Roman in 1670, and they had eight sons, one of whom, Pierre, born in 1673, also became a fountain-maker. Five of the sons died prematurely, and the other two sons went into the church.

Marie Roman died in 1679, and the following year Beausire remarried to Marie-Catherine Le Trotteur, the daughter of a wealthy merchant. They had nineteen children, many of whom became part of his fountain workshop.

In 1681, he began working on royal construction projects, including the gates of the Palais Royale, and the reconstruction of the fontaine Sainte-Avoye. In 1683, with the help of his wealthy father-in-law, he purchased the title of Master of Masonry Works of the City of Paris. In 1690, he received the additional title from Louis XIV of controller of public works of Paris. (contrôleur des bâtiments de la Ville). In 1706 he was given a new title, Maître Général, Contrôleur et inspecteur des bâtiments, in charge of all the fountains in Paris. He had to pay 50,000 livres for this new post, but it entitled him to an annual income of 2500 livres in fees and 2500 in appointments.

Beausire was extremely active in his post. Among his projects was the transformation of the old walls of the city into parks planted with trees (1670); installing a statue of Louis XIV in front of the Hotel de Ville (1689); the development of Place Vendôme and Place des Victoires; building a barracks for the royal Musketeers on rue Chareton; rebuilding the Petit Pont after it burned (1718-1719), and creating a whole new neighborhood between the rue des Filles-du-Calvaire and the rue du Temple.

Jean Beausire was received as a member of the Académie Royale d'Architecture in 1716.

The many children of Beausire entered into marriages with prominent architects and families, creating a whole dynasty of architects. For instance, in 1717 his daughter Catherine-Elisabeth Beausire married Barthélémy Bourdet, one of the most successful architects in Paris. His son Jean-Baptiste-Augustin Beausire, became a prominent architect and assumed his father's official titles, and his grandson, Pierre-Louis Moreau, was the last municipal architect of the Old Regime, and died under the guillotine during the French Revolution on 9 July 1794. The grandson of Jean Beausire, Simon Beausire (Paris 1648-1712 Rome) in Rome in 1683 he married Angela di Bartolomeo Manzoni and were born the landscape artist Giovanni Battista Busiri (Rome 1698-1757) and Giulio Busiri (Rome 1687-1764); Giulio is the forefather of today's architects Busiri Vici (Rome-Italy).

== The Fountains of Jean Beausire ==
Beausire is best remembered for his fountains. According to architectural historian Isabelle Derens, "...his fountains resembled his character. Sober structures, without unnecessary ornament; they were above all useful urban constructions, without excessive monumentality or extravagance."

His fountains include:

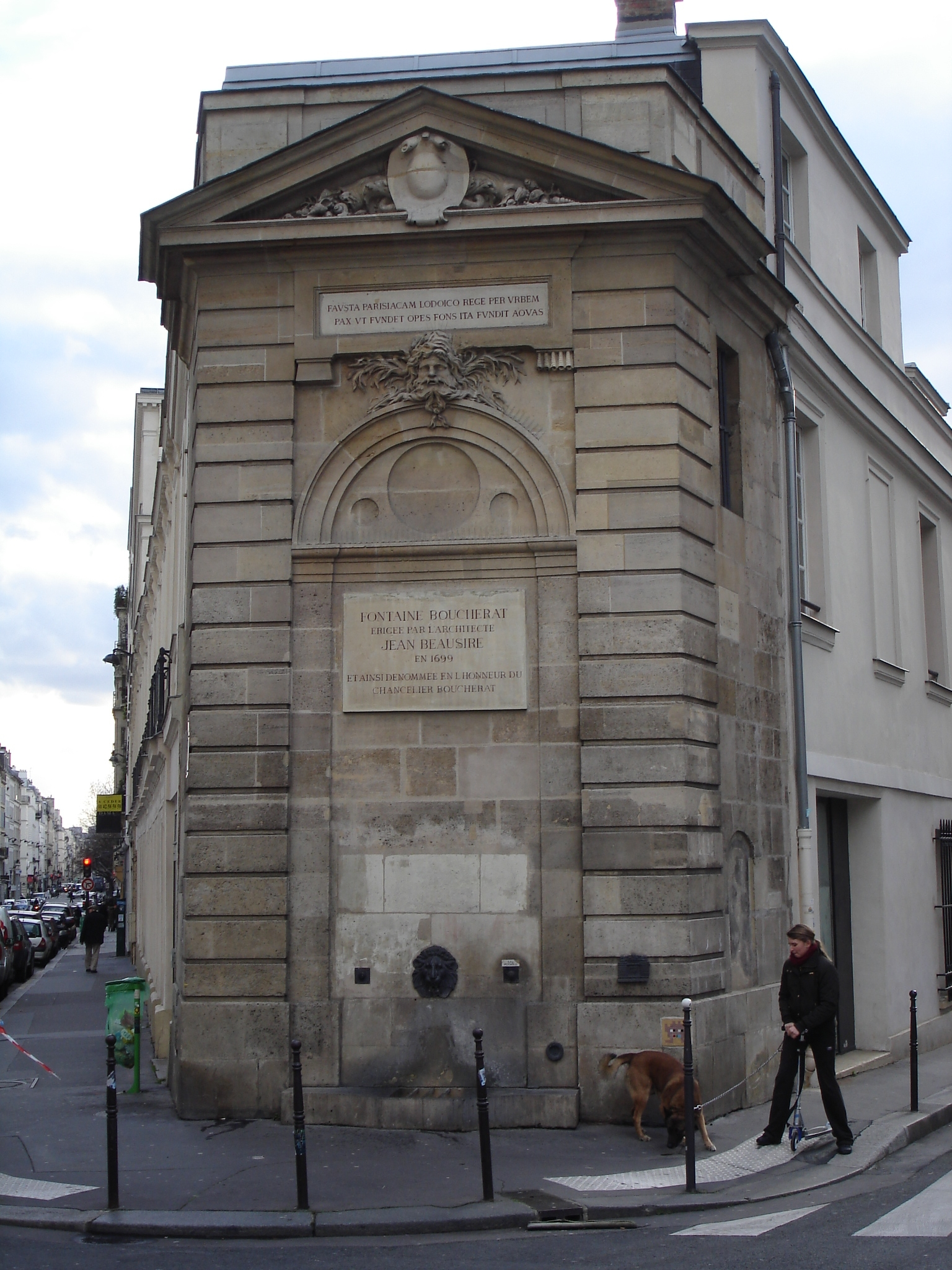
Fontaine Boucherat, Rue de Turenne, (1695-1699)

- Fontaine saint-Avoye (reconstruction of existing fountain) (1682)
- Fontaine Saint-Séverin, (reconstruction) (1685)
- Fontaine de l'Echaudé Richelieu (reconstruction) (1686)
- Fontaine Saint-Victor (moving from another location) (1686)
- Fontaine de Vendôme (1697)
- Fontaine Boucherat (1699)
- Fontaine Saint-Lazare (1699)
- Fontaine des Récollets (1700)
- The Fontaine de Paradis (Reconstruction of earlier fountain) (1705)
- Fontaine du regard de Soubise (1706)
- Fontaine des Blancs-Manteaux (1725)
- Fontaine Sainte-Catherine (reconstruction) (1707)
- Fontaine de Louis-le-Grand (1707)
- Fontaine le regard des Annonciades (1710)
- Fontaine de Saint-Martin (1712)
- Fontaine de Montmartre (1713-1715)
- Fontaine de l'Abbaye de Saint-Germain-des-Prés, (1715-1717)
- Fontaine de la Petite-Halle, (1719)
- Fontaine de de Basfroid, (1719)
- Fontaine de Charonne (1719)

Fontaine de la Reine (reconstruction of earlier fountain) (1732)

- Fontaine Maubuée (reconstruction) (1733)

== Existing Fountains by Jean Beausire ==
- The Fontaine de la Reine (1732) at the corner of rue Saint-Denis and rue Greneta, 2nd arrondissement.
- The Fontaine de Paradis, (1705), corner of rue de Paradis and rue du Chaume, 3rd arrondissement.
- The Fontaine des Blancs-Manteaux, (1725), in square des Blancs-Manteaux, against the wall of the church, 4th arrondissement
- Fontaine Maubuée, (1733), Rue Saint-Martin and rue Venise, 4th arrondissement
- Fontaine Boucherat (1698), rue Charlot et rue de Turenne, 4th arrondissement
- The Fontaine Saint-Severin, (1685), corner of rue Saint-Severin and rue Saint-Jacques, 5th arrondissement
- Fontaine de de Basfroid, (1719), rue de Basfroid and rue de Charonne, 11th arrondissement
- Fontaine de l'Abbaye de Saint-Germain-des-Prés, (1715-1717) now in Place Langevin, 5th arrondissement.
- Fontaine de la Petite-Halle, (1719), corner of Fauboug-Saint-Antoine and re de Montreuil, 11th arrondissement
- Fontaine de Charonne,(1719), corner of rue de Charonne and Faubourg St. Antoine, 11th arrondissement

== Bibliography ==
- Paris et ses fontaines, de la Renaissance à nos jours, from the Collection Paris et son patrimoine, directed by Béatrice de Andia, Délégué Général a l'Action artistique de la Ville de Paris.
- Lance, Adolph, Dictionnaire des architects, 1872, volume 8, I, pgs. 38-39
- Le Bas, Philippe, editor (1840). France. Dictionnaire encyclopédique, volume 1 (A–Az). Paris: Didot Frères. See the article "Académie d'architecture", pp. 82–85 (at Google Books).

See also Fountains in Paris
