= Brigitte Macron =

Wife of French president Emmanuel Macron (born 1953)

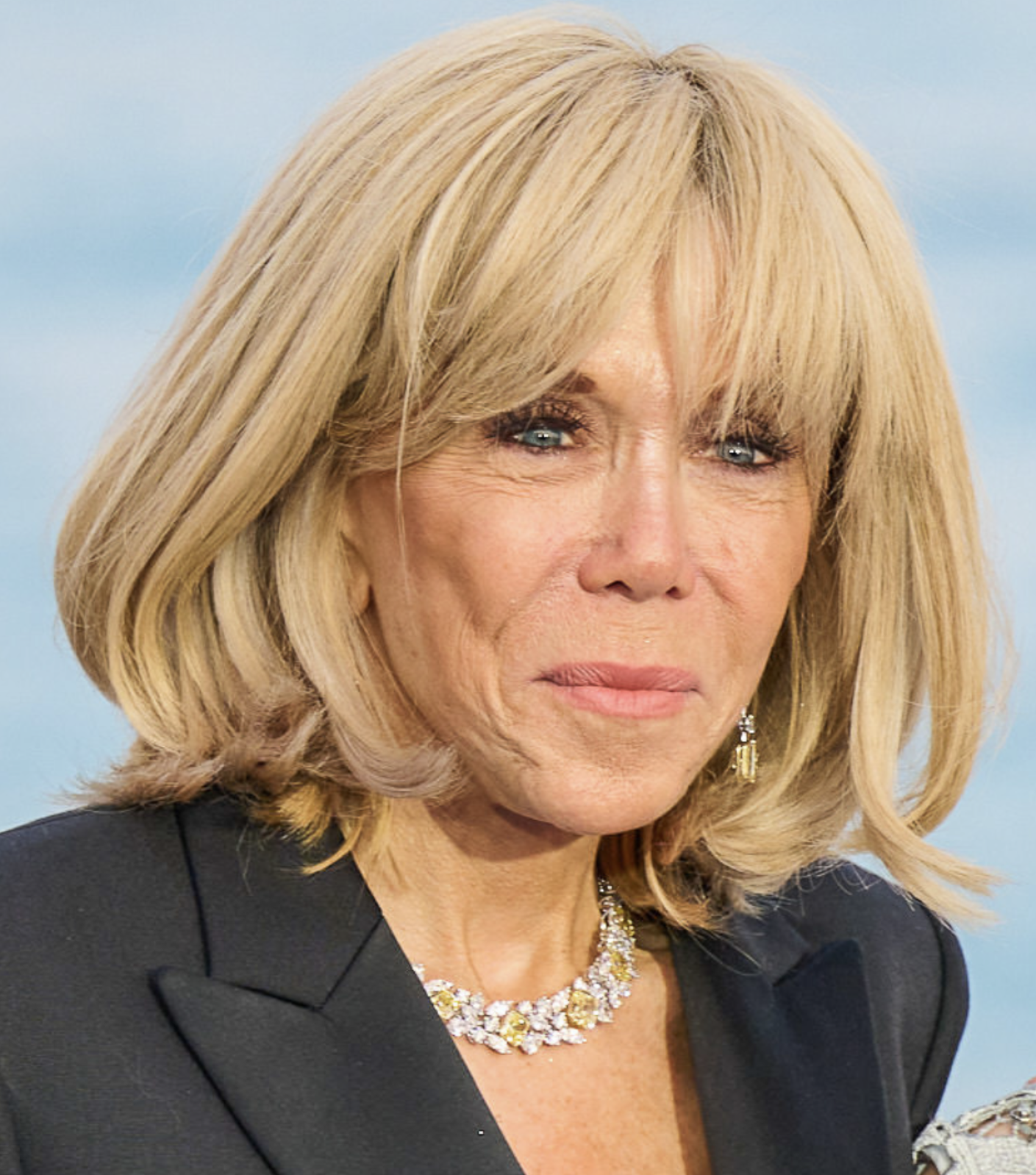
- Macron in 2025

Spouse of the President of France
- Current
- Assumed role 14 May 2017
- President: Emmanuel Macron
- Preceded by: Valérie Trierweiler (2014)

Personal details
- Born: Brigitte Marie-Claude Trogneux; 13 April 1953 (age 73) Amiens, Somme, France
- Spouses: André-Louis Auzière (m. 1974; div. 2006) Emmanuel Macron (m. 2007)
- Children: 3, including Laurence Auzière
- Profession: Teacher

Brigitte Marie-Claude Macron (Note: French pronunciation: [bʁiʒit maʁi klod makʁɔ̃].) (née Trogneux, (Note: French pronunciation: [tʁɔɲø].) later Auzière; (Note: French pronunciation: [ozjɛʁ].) born 13 April 1953) is a French former teacher. She is married to Emmanuel Macron, who has served as President of France since 14 May 2017.

== Early life ==
Brigitte Marie-Claude Trogneux was born in Amiens, in the Somme department of northern France. She is the youngest of six children of Simone (née Pujol; 1910–1998) and Jean Trogneux (1909–1994), the owners of the five-generation Chocolaterie Trogneux, founded in 1872 in Amiens. The company, now known by her father's name, is run by her nephew, Jean-Alexandre Trogneux. She was raised in a Catholic household and she attended the Lycée du Sacré-Cœur, a private Catholic school in Amiens.

== Career ==
Macron, at the time Brigitte Auzière, taught literature at the Collège Lucie-Berger in Strasbourg in the 1980s. By the 1990s, she was teaching French and Latin at Lycée la Providence, a Jesuit high school in Amiens. From 2007 to 2015, she taught at Lycée Saint-Louis de Gonzague, in the 16th arrondissement of Paris, one of the most prestigious French private schools. At that institution, she was the French teacher of Frédéric and Jean Arnault, sons of French luxury business tycoon Bernard Arnault.

It was at the after-school drama club of Lycée la Providence where she and Emmanuel Macron first met. She was in charge of the after-school theater club he attended when he was 15 alongside her own daughter Laurence who was in his class. Their relationship has attracted controversy, as she is his senior by close to 25 years, and he was a minor; Macron has described it as "a love often clandestine, often hidden, misunderstood by many before imposing itself".

== Politics ==
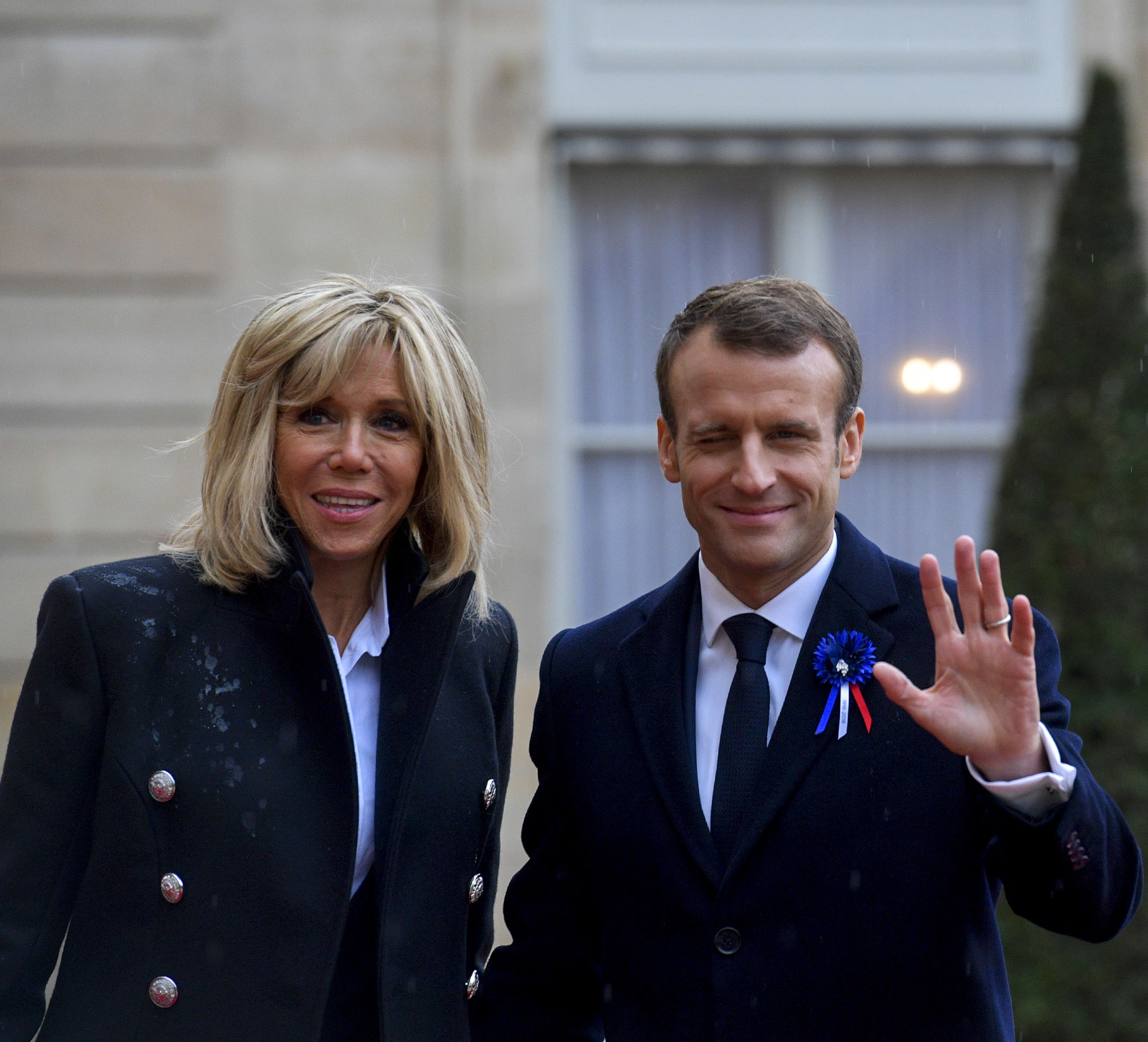
French president Emmanuel Macron with Brigitte in November 2018.

In 1989, Brigitte Macron (then Auzière) unsuccessfully ran for a seat in the city council of Truchtersheim. It was the only time she ran for office.

In 2017, Brigitte Macron played an active role in her husband's presidential campaign; a top adviser was quoted as saying that "her presence is essential for him". During his campaign, Emmanuel Macron stated that upon his winning of the French presidency, his wife would "have the role that she always had, she will not be hidden".

He proposed creating an official "first lady" (première dame) title (as the spouse of the French president currently holds no official title) coming with their own staff, office and a personally allocated budget for their activities. Following Macron's election as president and his previously outspoken stance against nepotism, a petition against his proposal gathered more than 275,000 signatures, and the French government announced that Brigitte Macron would not hold the official title of "first lady" and would not be allocated an official budget. In an interview with French magazine Elle, she stated that a soon-to-be published transparency charter would clarify her "role and accompanying resources", including the composition and size of her staff. This charter was published the following Friday.

== Public image ==
Macron's style of dress at international meetings has been a subject of commentary. The Financial Times described her style as similar to that of an "Essex girl". Close to Bernard Arnault's family, she was dressed for free by Louis Vuitton during her official outings, which created controversy.

In May 2025, Macron was filmed shoving her hand in her husband Emmanuel's face, which he described as "joking around".

=== Complaints ===
In March 2018, the office of the Élysée Palace filed a complaint for identity theft after discovering that Brigitte Macron's name was being used to obtain preferential treatment in luxury establishments through a false email address. According to the office, the complaint was related to "a very clear attempt to harm [Brigitte Macron's] reputation". In October 2021, a 35-year-old man who claimed to be Brigitte Macron's nephew was sentenced to 30 months in prison, 18 of which were suspended, for identity theft, attempted fraud, and fraud as a repeat offender.

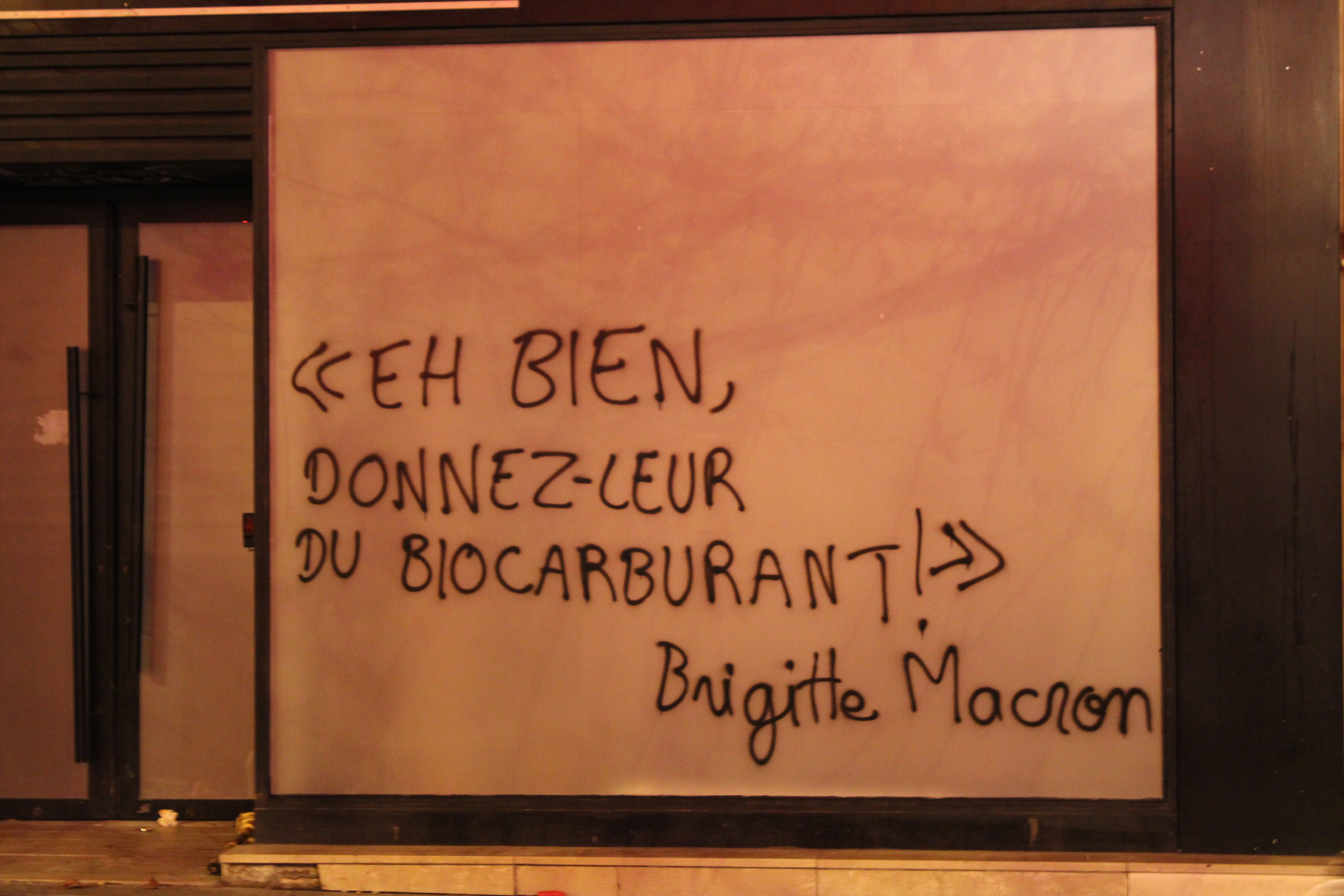
Yellow Vest slogan (“Well, give them biofuel!”) targeting Brigitte Macron, in reference to a statement attributed to Marie-Antoinette

In August 2020, during the presidential couple's vacation at the Fort de Brégançon, yellow vest protesters gathered on a nearby beach and launched several inflatable lobsters, one of which bore insults directed at the "First Lady". On 30 September, before the Toulon Criminal Court, one of the protesters was tried for "public insult to the President of the Republic" and "public insult and defamation of individual(s)". According to Var-Matin, the case was dismissed due to a procedural defect. Lawyer Juan Branco argued that an employee of the Élysée Palace filed the complaint without a mandate and in the absence of Brigitte Macron's signature, leading the court to accept the nullity plea based on the provisions of the law of 29 July 1881, on freedom of the press.

On 22 August 2018, Thierry-Paul Valette filed a complaint against Brigitte Macron at the Lisieux police station as part of the transparency charter. The grounds for the complaint were the offenses of passive influence peddling, passive corruption, and complicity in a passive conflict of interest by a person charged with a public service mission. The case was closed without further action in August 2019.

Brigitte Macron's image has also been illegally exploited by several scammers online, who used it to sell and promote anti-wrinkle creams, falsely claiming she was the muse or creator of these products.

In 2025, a group of people faced harassment charges following an online campaign claiming that Brigitte Macron was secretly a transgender woman. The Macrons had previously filed defamation lawsuits regarding the campaign. In 2026, a court in Paris convicted 10 people over the charges, with most being handed suspended prison sentences.

On July 23, 2025, Brigitte and Emmanuel Macron sued Candace Owens and her limited liability company for numerous counts of defamation and false light in Delaware state court because Owens had been publicly claiming, since March 2024, that Brigitte Macron was a biological man named Jean-Michel Trogneux. The Macrons are suing for punitive damages and have claimed that they have suffered "substantial economic damages" such as the loss of business opportunities.

== Personal life ==
On 22 June 1974, Brigitte married banker André-Louis Auzière (1951–2019), with whom she had three children: Sébastien (born 1975), Laurence (born 1977), and Tiphaine (born 1984). They resided in Truchtersheim until 1991, when they moved back to Amiens.

In 1993, at the age of 39, she met the 15-year-old Emmanuel Macron in Lycée la Providence, where she was a teacher and he was a student and a classmate of her daughter. Brigitte divorced Auzière in January 2006 and married Macron on 20 October 2007.

She defines herself as a non-practising Catholic.

== Honours ==
=== Foreign honours ===
- Denmark:
  - Grand Cross of the Order of the Dannebrog (28 August 2018)
  - Grand Cross with Breast Star in Diamonds of the Order of the Dannebrog (31 March 2025)
- Italy: Grand Cross of the Order of Merit of the Italian Republic (1 July 2021)
- Ivory Coast: Commander of the Order of the Ivory Coast (21 December 2019)
- Monaco: Grand Cross of the Order of Grimaldi (7 June 2025)
- Norway: Grand Cross of the Order of Merit (23 June 2025)
- Portugal: Grand Cross of the Order of Infante Henry (27 February 2025)
- Spain: Grand Cross of the Order of Isabella the Catholic (23 September 2026)
- Sweden: Commander Grand Cross of the Order of the Polar Star (30 January 2024)

== Notes ==
Unofficial roles
Vacant Title last held by Valérie Trierweiler	Spouse of the President of France; 2017–present	Incumbent
