= Lycée la Providence =

Location
- 146 Boulevard de Saint-Quentin; Amiens, Hauts-de-France, Somme; France

Information
- Type: Private lycée, collège and technical college
- Religious affiliation: Catholicism
- Denomination: Jesuit
- Director: Albert Courtois
- Grades: R-12; post-baccalaureate
- Gender: Co-educational
- Age range: 2 – 18
- Affiliation: l'association Ignace de Loyola Education

Lycée la Providence is a private Catholic lycée, collège and technical college, located in Amiens, Hauts-de-France, in the Somme department of France. Founded and run by the Society of Jesus, the facility offers education from kindergarten through professional and technological training.

== Programs ==
Current language exchange programs include the countries of Germany, England, Peru, China, Italy, and Netherlands. Intramural sports include rugby, basketball, football, swimming, water polo, gymnastics, badminton, handball, futsal, bodybuilding, and table tennis. Interscholastic sports competition in a given year has produced championships most notably in swimming, water polo, handball, and judo.

Boarding facilities accommodate 460 girls and boys, from sixth standard through post-baccalaureate. Besides the swimming pool there is a 24-hectare (59-acre) park around the facility.

Solidarity with the poor and disadvantaged are instilled through various Pastoral Department programs throughout the year. The school has an elaborate scholarship program for those in need. Parents are encouraged to be a part of the French L'A.P.E.L movement for the promotion of their values as parents.

== Notable alumni ==
- Jean-Paul Delevoye, former delegate minister in charge of the pension reform in the second Philippe government
- Laurent Delahousse, journalist and TV presenter
- Fabrice Éboué, French humorist and actor
- Olivier Guéant, French mathematician
- Philippe Leclerc de Hauteclocque, French general during WW2 and Marshal of France
- Frédérique Macarez, politician.
- Emmanuel Macron, President of France
- François Ruffin, French journalist and politician
- Jón Sveinsson, Icelandic Jesuit Priest and author of the "Nonni" books series

== Notable former staff ==
- Brigitte Trogneux, former teacher and wife of Emmanuel Macron

== See also ==
- Catholic Church in France
- Education in France
- List of Jesuit schools
