= Jean Trogneux =

French chocolatier

- Industry: Chocolatier
- Founded: 1872; 153 years ago
- Founder: Jean-Baptiste Trogneux
- Headquarters: Amiens, France
- Products: Chocolate
- Net income: 116,395 euro (2022)
- Number of employees: 39 (2022)

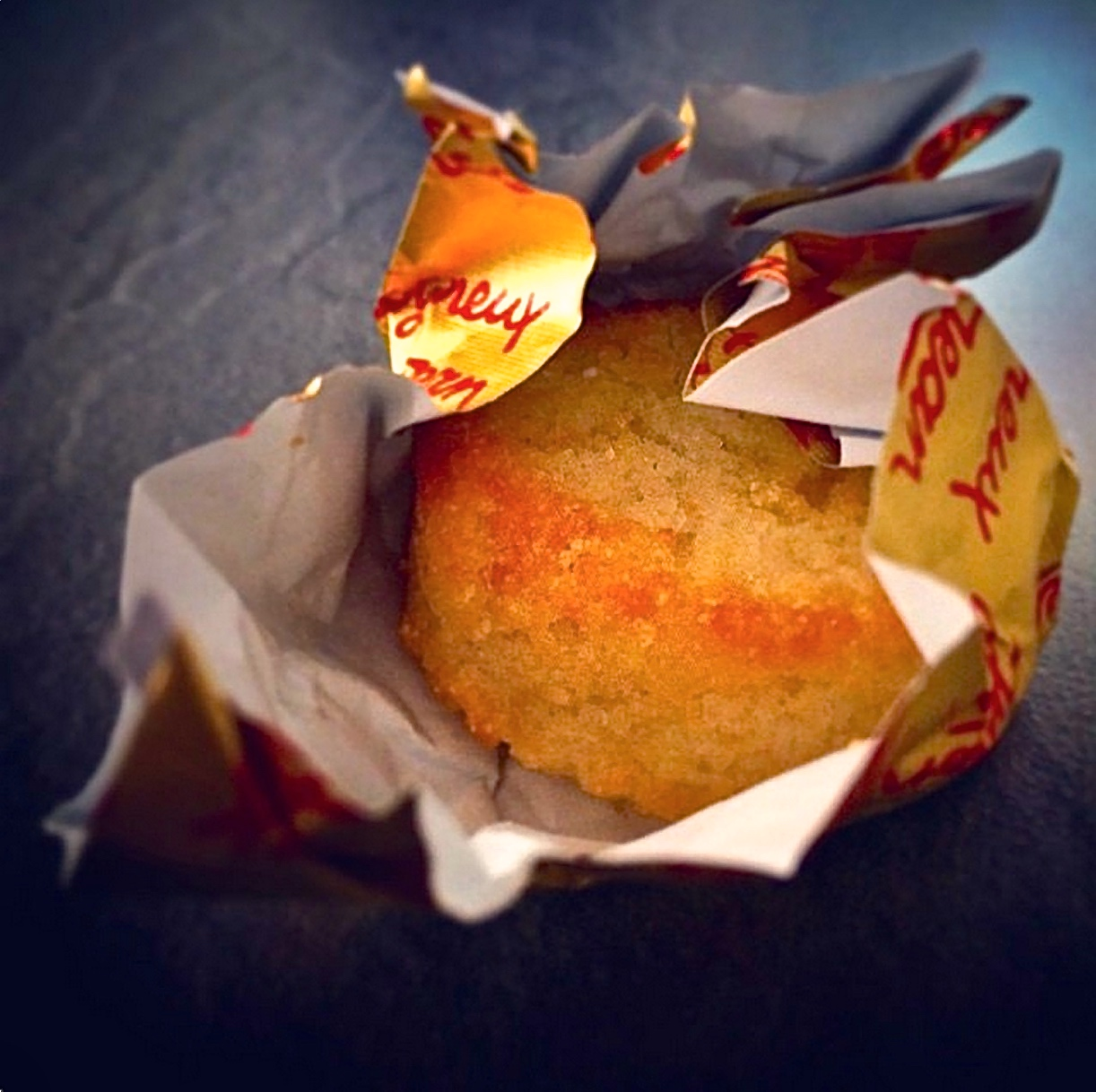
Macarons d'Amiens

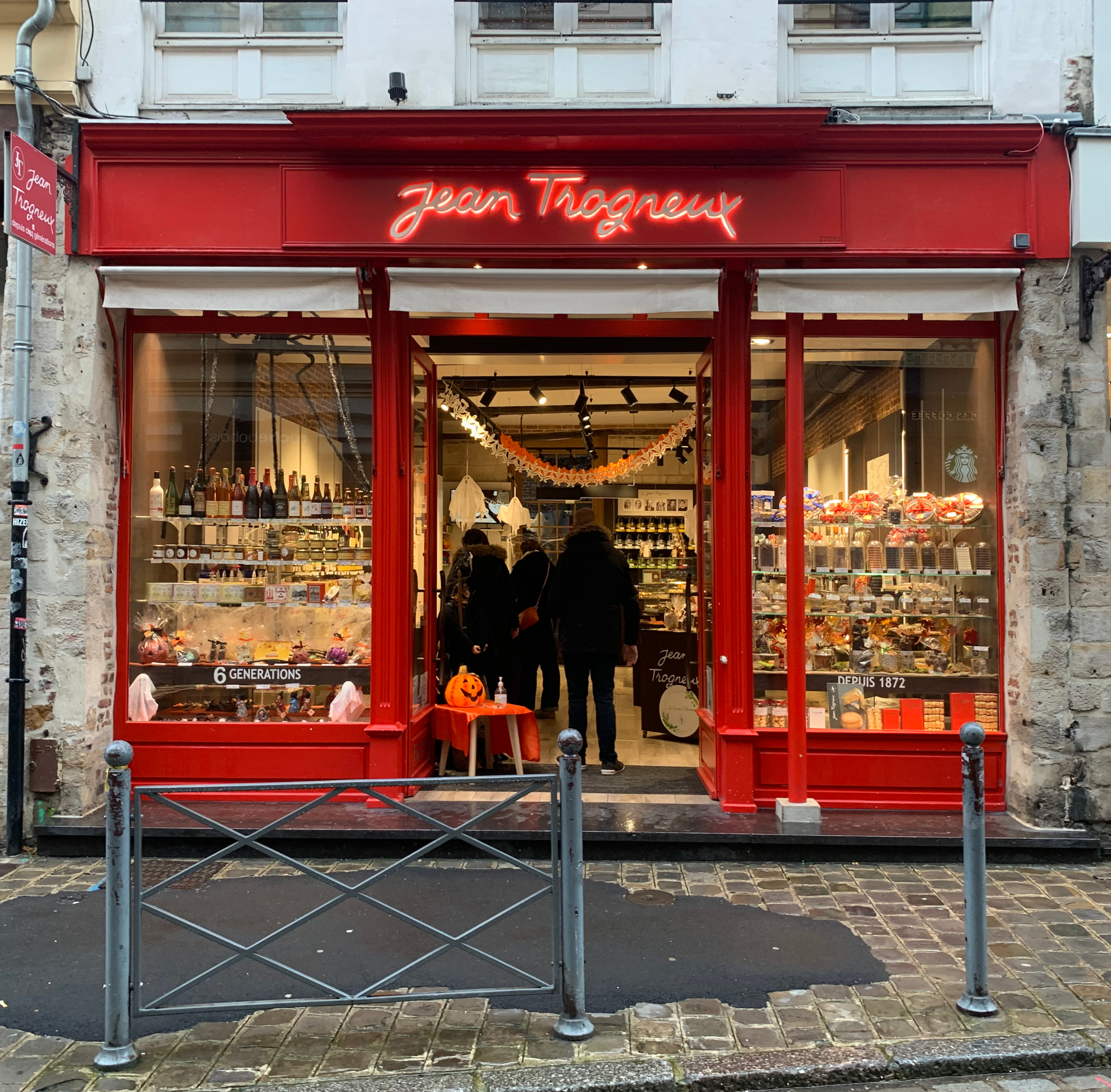
The shop in Lille

Jean Trogneux is a chocolatier based in Place Notre Dame, in the centre of Amiens, France and run by five generations of the Trogneux family. They are best known for their macarons, of which they manufacture two million every year. As well as seven outlets in Amiens, they have shops in other cities in Picardy and the north of France – Lille, Arras and Saint-Quentin.

== Retail outlets ==
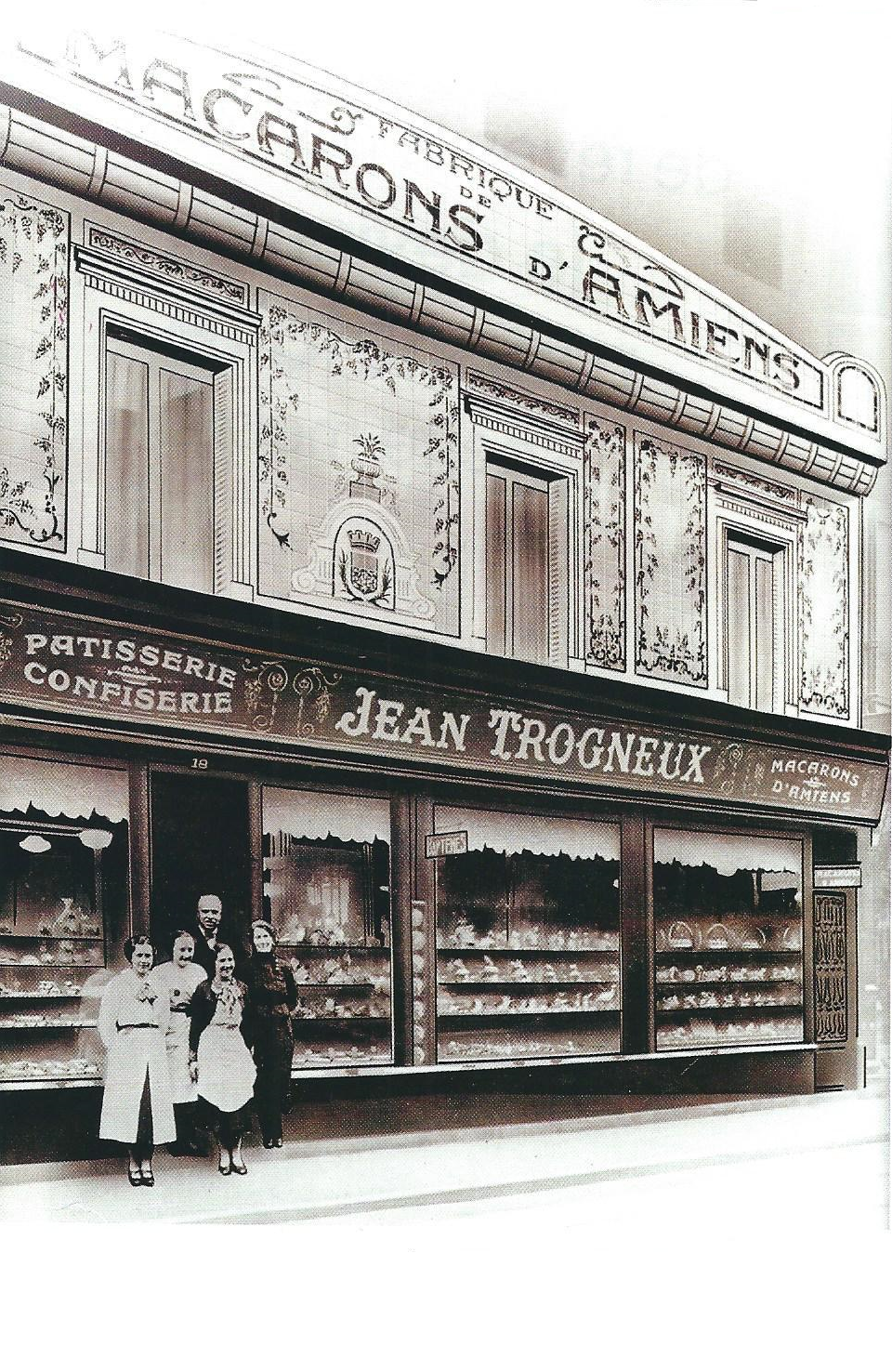
1st generation in 1872

Trogneux have seven retail shops in Amiens, as well as Lille, Arras and Saint-Quentin, in Picardy and the north of France.

== Products ==
Jean Trogneux produces chocolates, macarons d'Amiens, douceurs de saison and sells jams, pâtés, honey and other regional specialities. Altogether they sell 800 different products, and in 2015 sold more than two million macarons.

They are particularly known for their macarons, and with family member Brigitte Trogneux married to Emmanuel Macron, the President of France, this has led to inevitable wordplay in the press, "On avait déjà le macaron d'Amiens. Maintenant, on a aussi le Macron d'Amiens !" (We already had the macaron of Amiens. Now we also have the Macron of Amiens!)

The recipe at the origin of the reputation the maison : The macaron d'Amiens, was created by Jean Trogneux in 1898 and has remain unchanged. The same artisanal fabrication technique and the same ingredients list composed of natural products only are used: Valencias almonds, sugar, honey, sweet almond oil, bitter almonds and egg white. The macaron d'Amiens has been popularized by the maison, main producer of this regional speciality.

The business is now run by Jean-Alexandre Trogneux, nephew of Brigitte Trogneux, and the fifth generation in charge of the family firm.
