= Truchtersheim =

- Commune
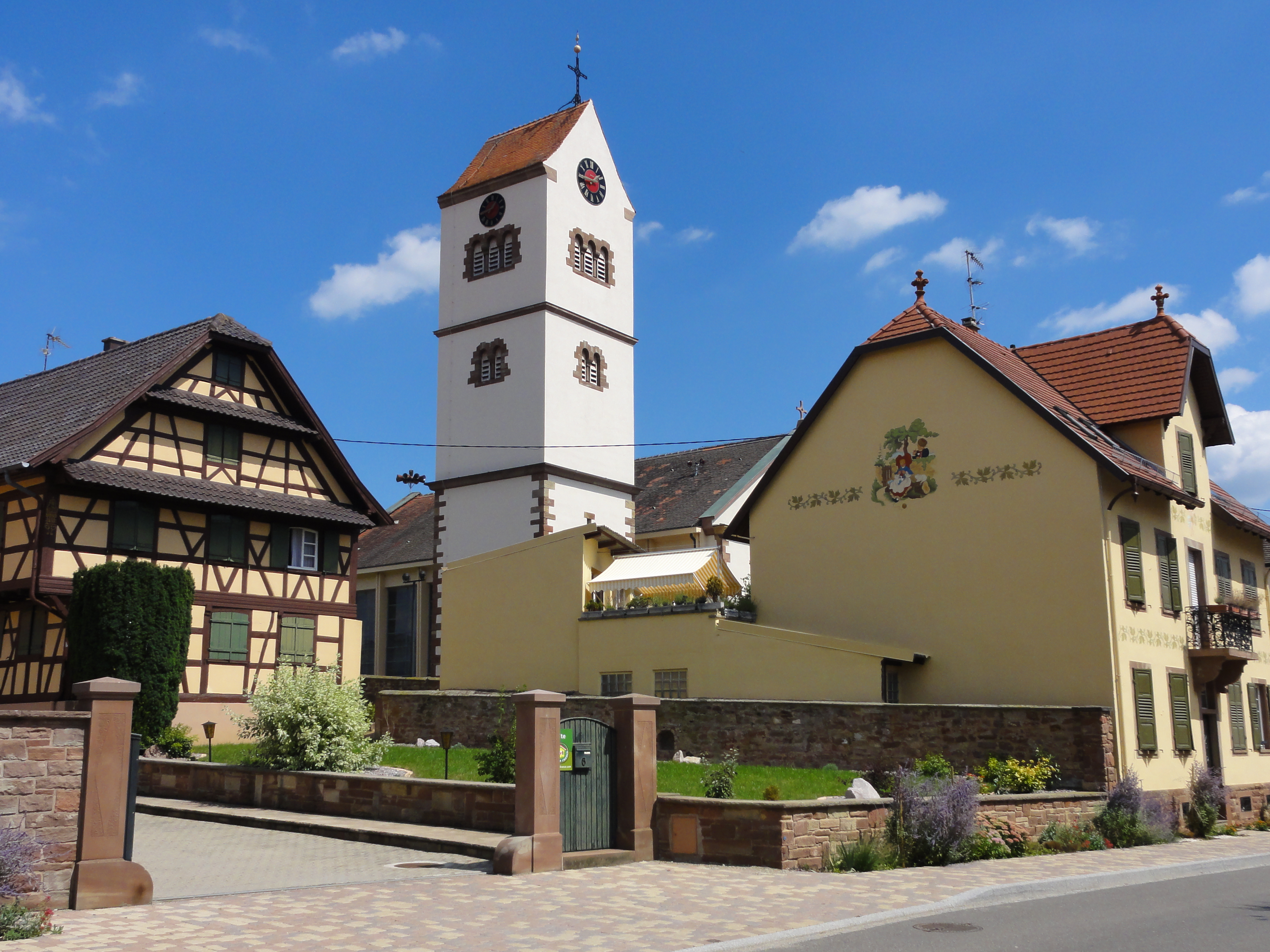
- The church in Truchtersheim

- Coat of arms
- Location of Truchtersheim
- Location within France Location within Grand Est
- Coordinates: 48°39′49″N 7°36′27″E
- Country: France
- Region: Grand Est
- Department: Bas-Rhin
- Arrondissement: Saverne
- Canton: Bouxwiller
- Intercommunality: CC Kochersberg

Government
  - Mayor (2020–2026): Justin Vogel
- Area^{1}: 14.76 km^{2} (5.70 sq mi)
- Highest elevation: 199 m (653 ft)
- Lowest elevation: 147 m (482 ft)
- Population (2023): 4,398
  - Density: 298.0/km^{2} (771.7/sq mi)
- Time zone: UTC+01:00 (CET)
  - Summer (DST): UTC+02:00 (CEST)
- INSEE/Postal code: 67495 /67370
- ^{1} French Land Register data, which excludes lakes, ponds, glaciers > 1 km^{2} (0.386 sq mi or 247 acres) and river estuaries.

Truchtersheim (French: [tʁyʃtɛʁsaim]; Alemannic German: [ˈtʁyʃtəʁsə]) is a commune in the Bas-Rhin department in Grand Est in north-eastern France. On 15 July 1974, Behlenheim was merged with Truchtersheim. On 1 January 2016, the former commune Pfettisheim was merged into Truchtersheim.

== Population ==
The population data given in the table below refer to the commune in its geography as of January 2025.

Historical population
Year	Pop.	±% p.a.
1968	1,199	—
1975	1,880	+6.64%
1982	2,413	+3.63%
1990	2,813	+1.94%
1999	3,125	+1.18%
2007	3,618	+1.85%
2012	3,746	+0.70%
2017	4,029	+1.47%
2023	4,398	+1.47%
Source: INSEE

== See also ==
- Communes of the Bas-Rhin department
- Kochersberg
