= Fountains in France =

Ancient Roman water supply in France

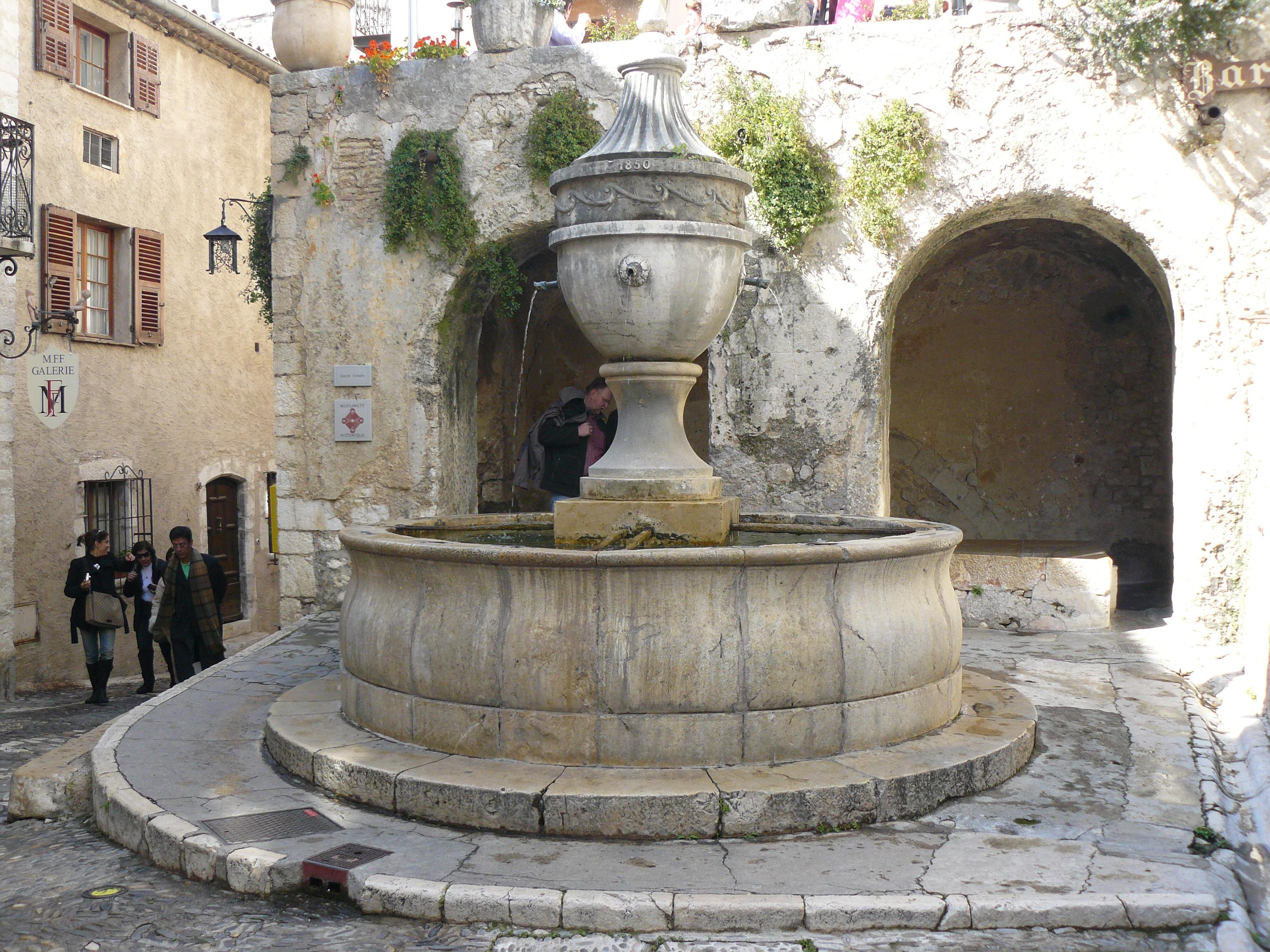
Bulb fountain in Saint-Paul de Vence (1850)

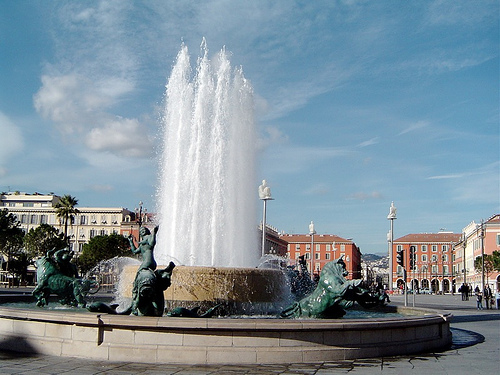
Fontaine de Soleil, Place Massena, Nice

Fountains in France provided drinking water to the inhabitants of the ancient Roman cities of France, and to French monasteries and villages during the Middle Ages. Later, they were symbols of royal power and grandeur in the gardens of the kings of France. Today, though they no longer provide drinking water, they decorate the squares and parks of French cities and towns.

== Roman fountains ==
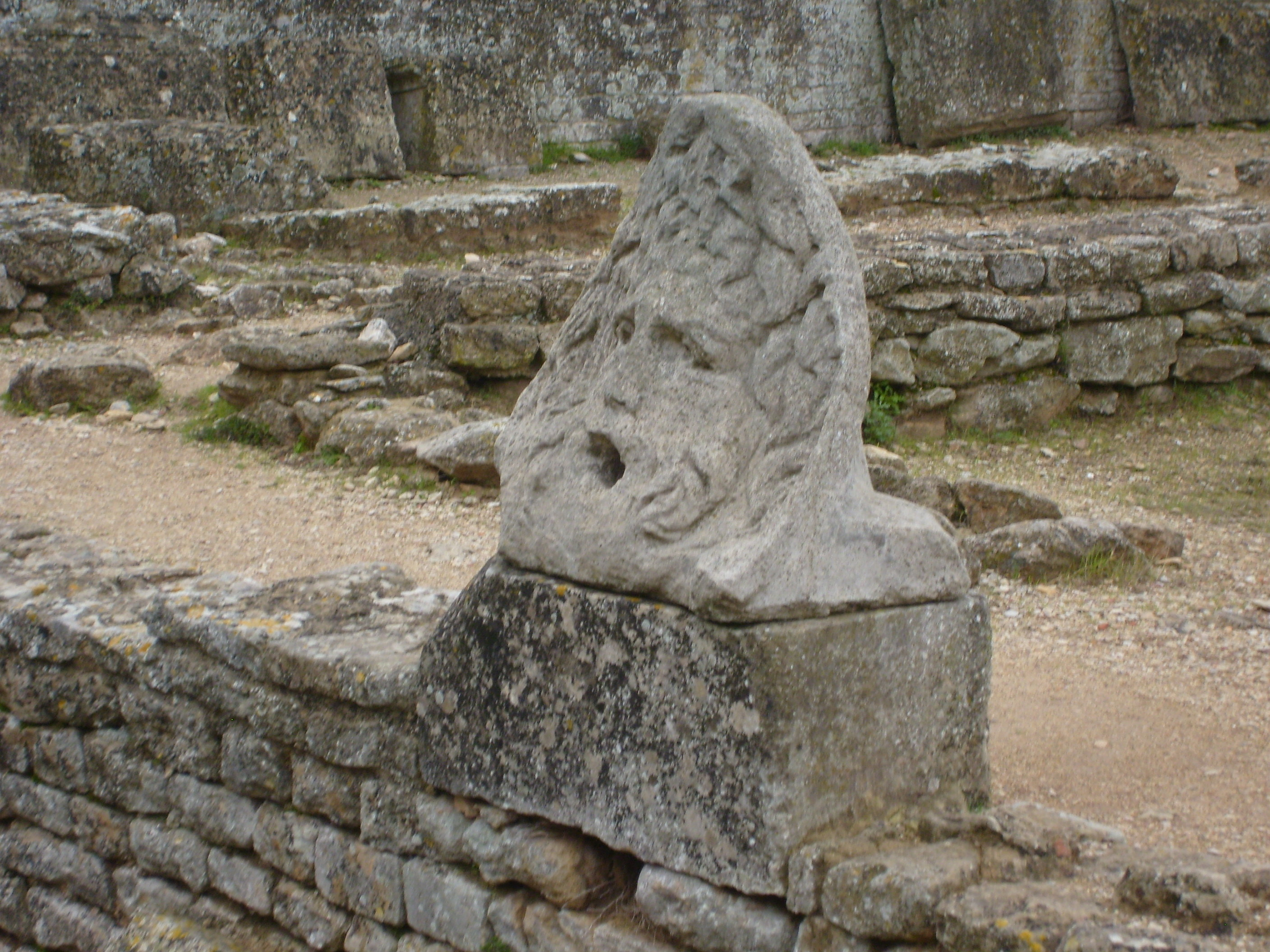
Roman fountain that spouted water into the bathing pool of the Roman baths of Glanum, in Provence. (1st century AD)

The first known fountains in France were built by Roman engineers in the first and second centuries A.D. in Glanum, Vaison-la-Romaine, Nîmes, and other towns of Provence. Like the fountains in Rome, they were fed with water from distant lakes and rivers aqueducts, sometimes more than fifty kilometres from the fountains. Remains of the aqueducts can be found outside Avignon, Arles, Aix-en-Provence, Glanum, and other Roman towns.

Once the water arrived in the cities, it was channelled into lead pipes which distributed it to street fountains, or direct to Roman baths and villas. Examples of these fountains can be seen in the ruins of Glanum and the museum at Vaison-La-Romaine.

The Roman street fountains were free-standing stone blocks connected to lead pipes beneath the street; water flowed through the pipes and then upward to spouts in the blocks, pushed by water pressure from the higher sources of the water and drawn by the siphon effect of the water flowing out of the spigots. The water emerged from the mouth of a mask shaped like an animal or human face. The water flowed continually, was collected into pots or jars, and was taken home.

Beginning in the 5th century A.D., with the invasion of barbarian tribes into France, the Roman fountain system began to break down. Aqueducts were wrecked or fell into ruin, cities were abandoned, and the fountains usually stopped working, either from destruction or from neglect. French cities were not to have a reliable water distribution system until the 18th century.

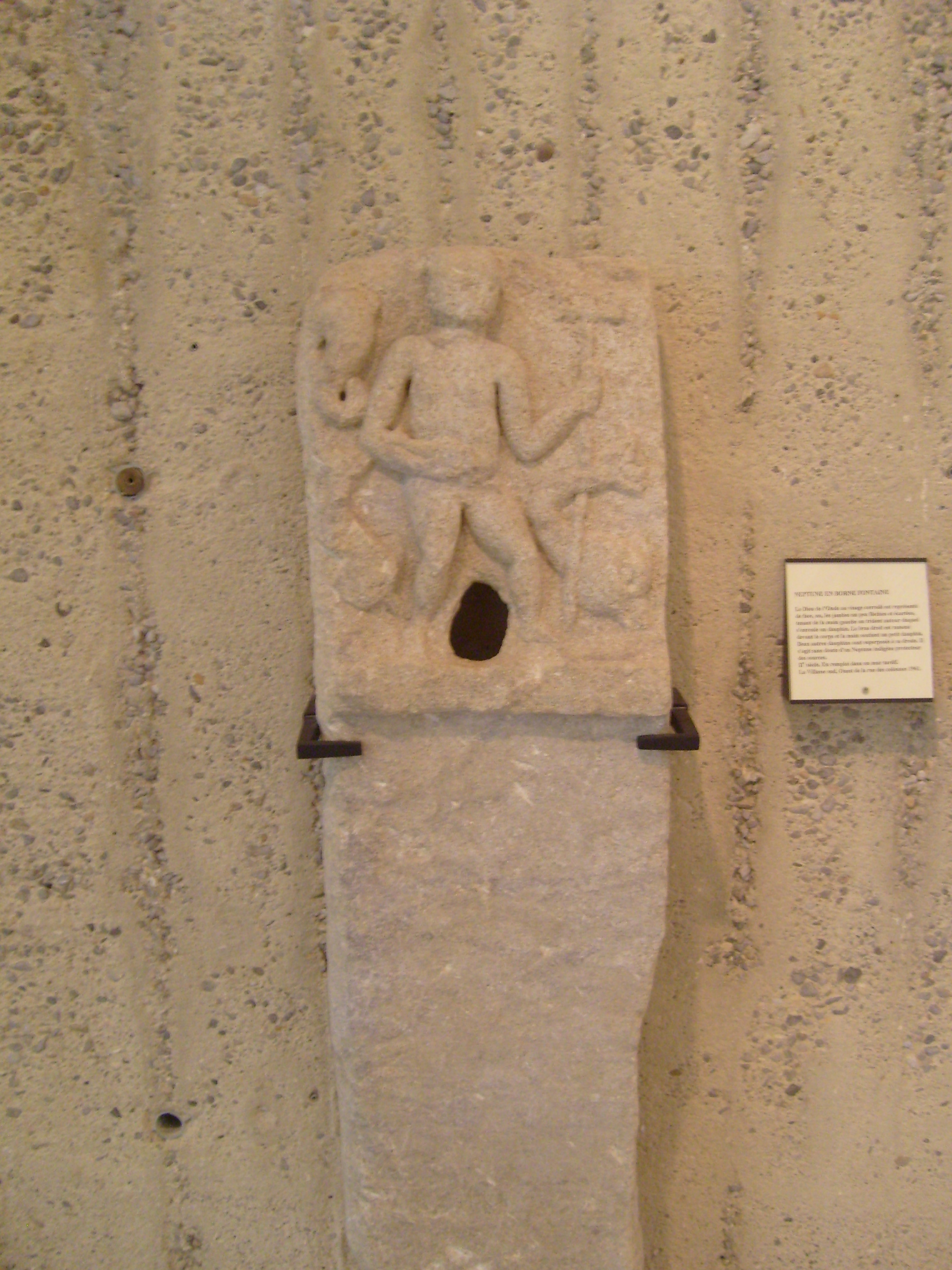
Stone of a Roman street fountain from Vaison-la-Romaine, in Provence (1st or 2nd century AD)

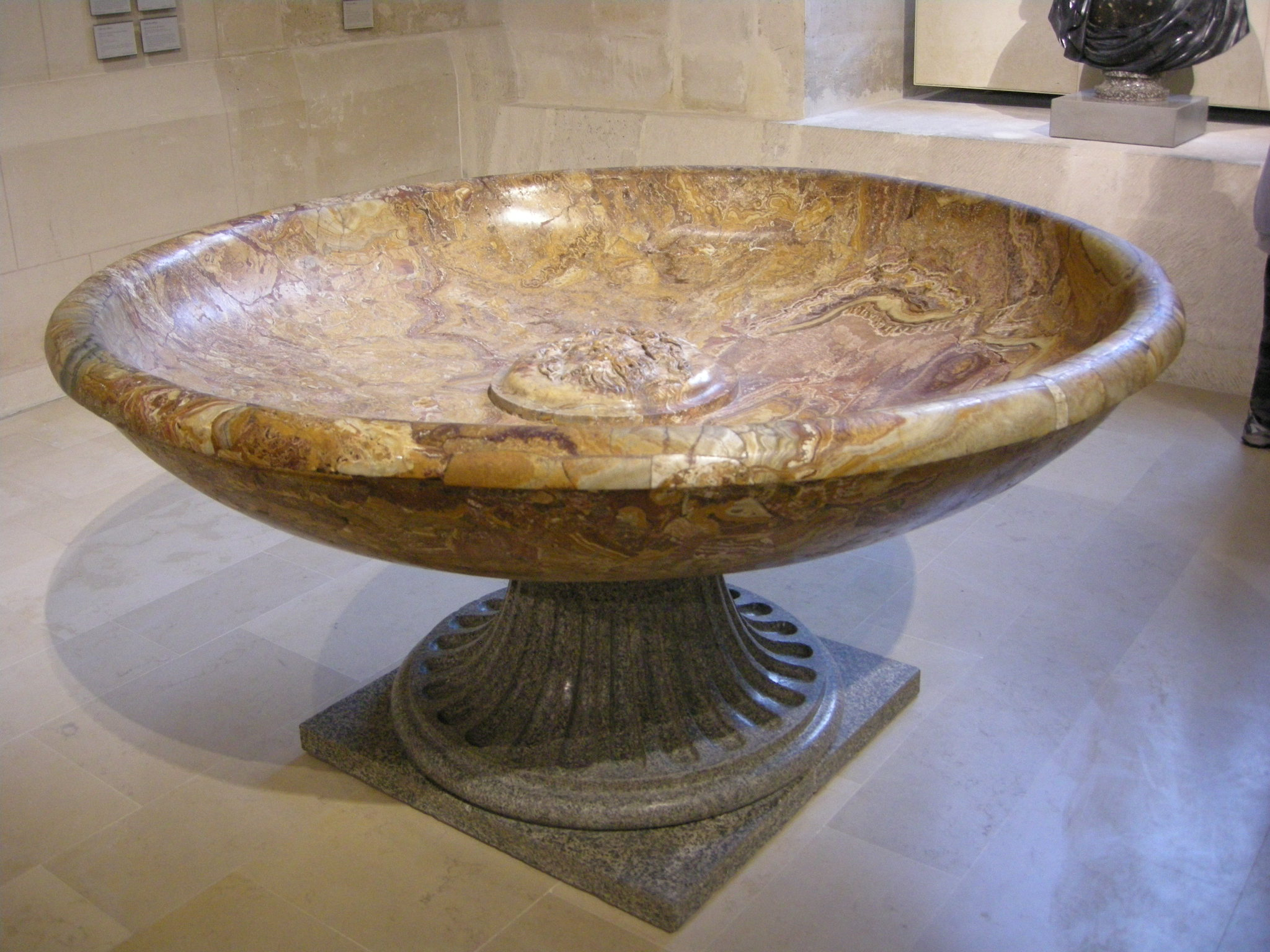
Vasque of an ancient Roman fountain in the Louvre, Paris

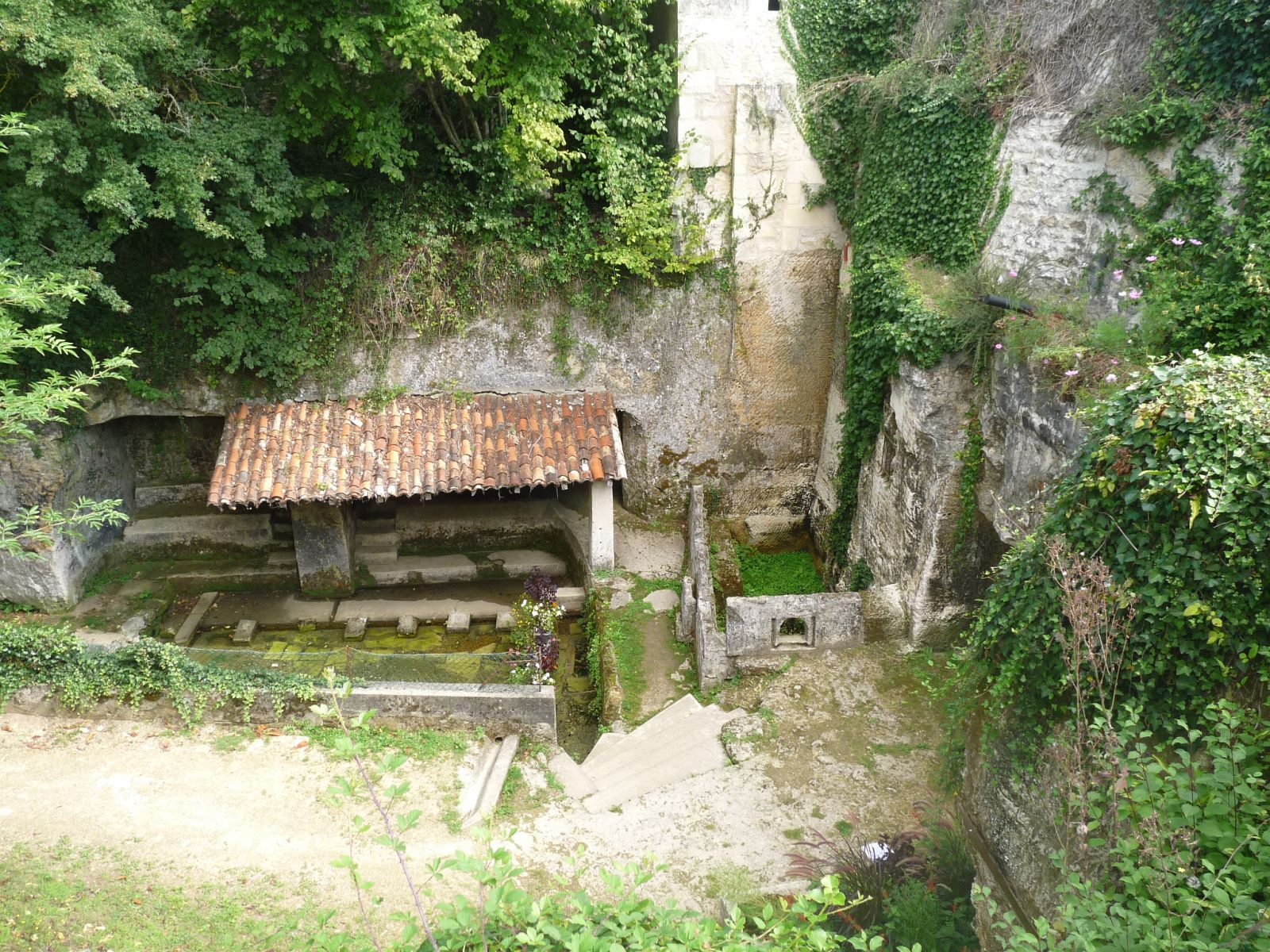
Roman fountain in Vénérand, Charente-Maritime, SW France

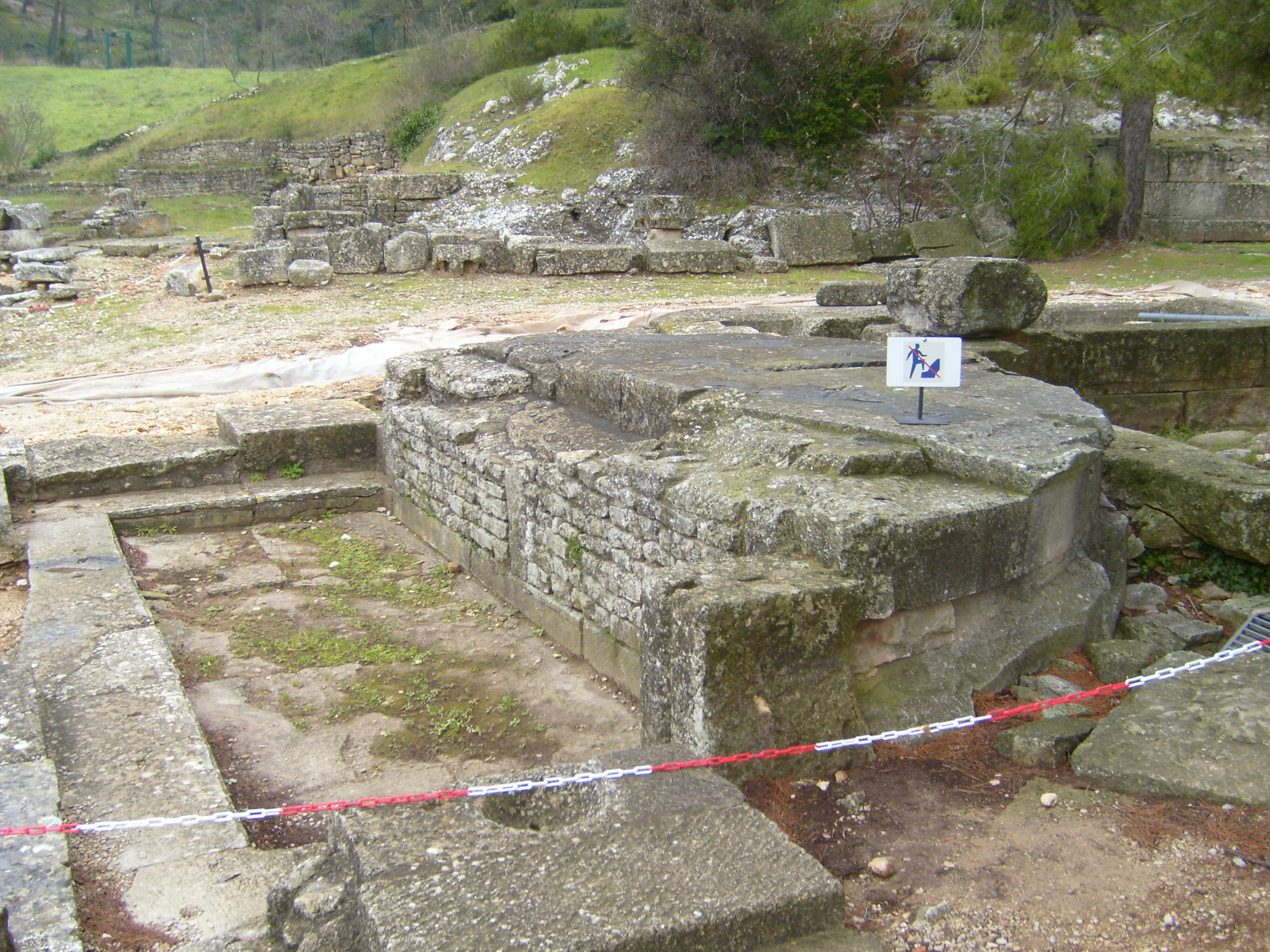
Remains of a monumental Roman fountain near the forum in Glanum, (about 20 BC)

== French Medieval Fountains ==
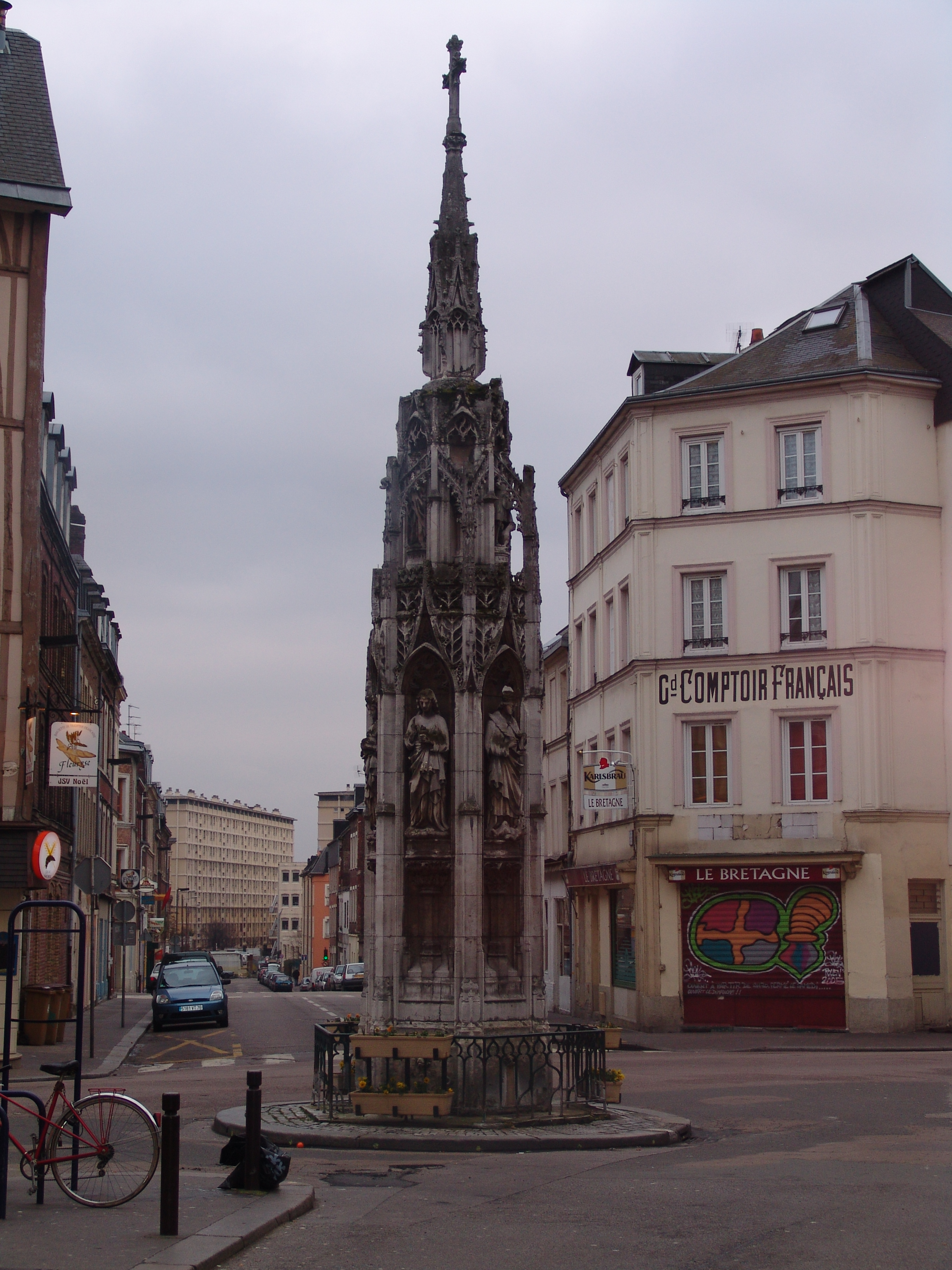
Fontaine de la Croix de Pierre, in Rouen (1519)

During the Middle Ages, Roman aqueducts were wrecked or fell into decay, and many fountains in France stopped working, so fountains existed mainly in art and literature, or in secluded monasteries or palace gardens.

Fountains in the Middle Ages were associated with the source of life, purity, wisdom, innocence, and the Garden of Eden. In illuminated manuscripts like the Tres Riches Heures du Duc de Berry (1411–1416), the Garden of Eden was shown with a graceful gothic fountain in the centre (see illustration).

The cloister of a monastery was supposed to be a replica of the Garden of Eden, protected from the outside world. Simple fountains, called lavabos, were placed inside Medieval monasteries such as Le Thoronet Abbey in Provence and were used for ritual washing before religious services and meals.

Fountains were also found in the enclosed medieval jardins d'amour, "gardens of courtly love" - ornamental gardens used for courtship and relaxion. The medieval romance The Roman de la Rose describes a fountain in the center of an enclosed garden, feeding small streams bordered by flowers and fresh herbs.

Medieval fountains could also provide amusement. The gardens of the Counts of Artois at the Chateau de Herdin, built in 1295, contained famous fountains, called Les Merveilles de Herdin which could be triggered to drench surprised visitors.

The Fontaine de la Croix-de-Pierre in Rouen is one of the few existing medieval fountains in France. It was built in 1517 next to a stone cross erected by the local bishop in 1197. It was demolished by the Calvinists in 1562, but was rebuilt. In 1792, during the French Revolution, the cross at the top was replaced by a bust of Marat. but this was removed in 1795. In 1872 the fountain was rebuilt according to the original plans. The original fountain can be seen in the garden of the Rouen Museum of antiquities.

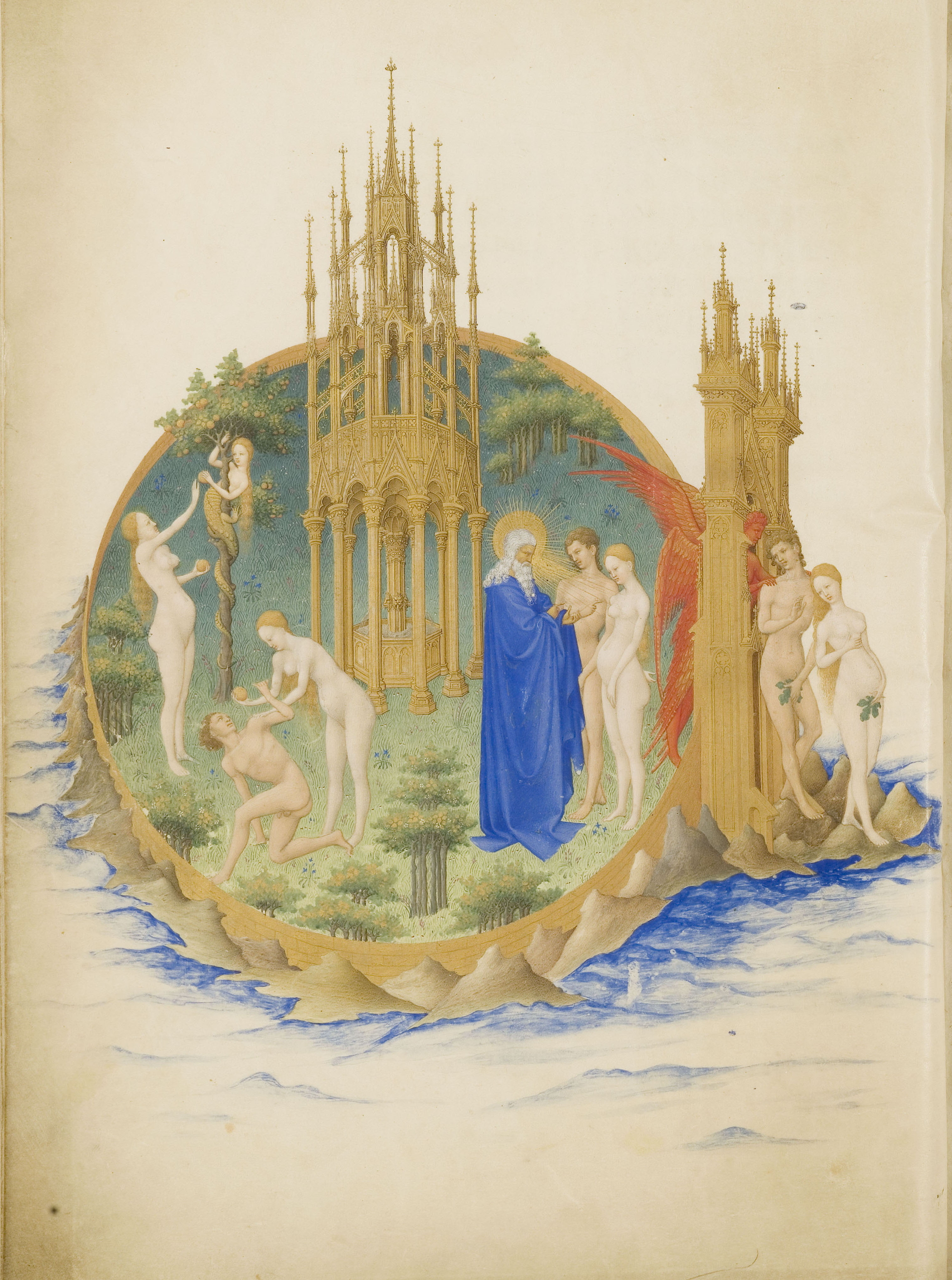
The Garden of Eden as depicted in the Tres Riches Heures du Duc de Berry (1411–1416) with a fountain in the center

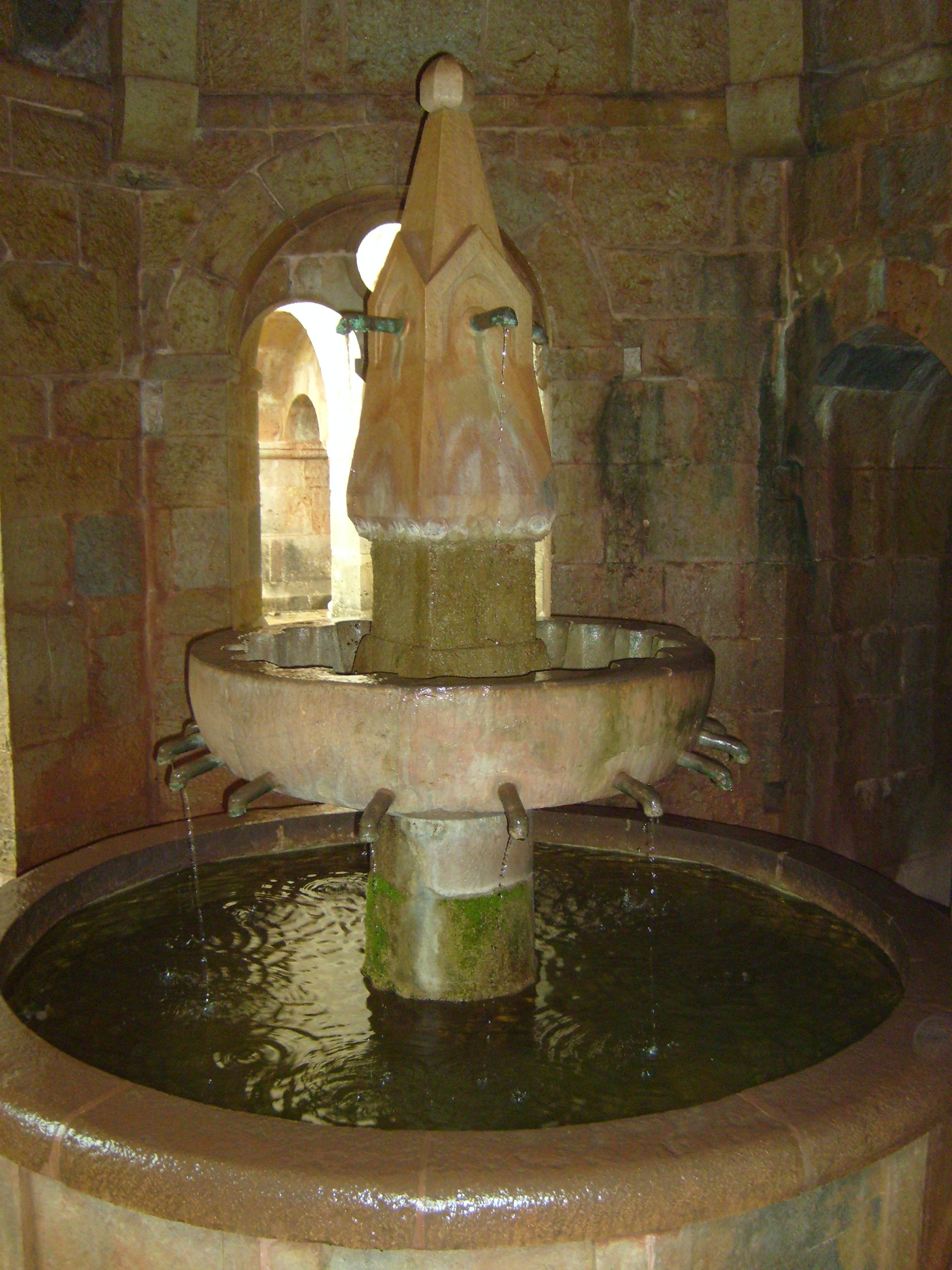
Lavabo at Le Thoronet Abbey, Provence, (12th century), for monks to wash their hands before meals and services

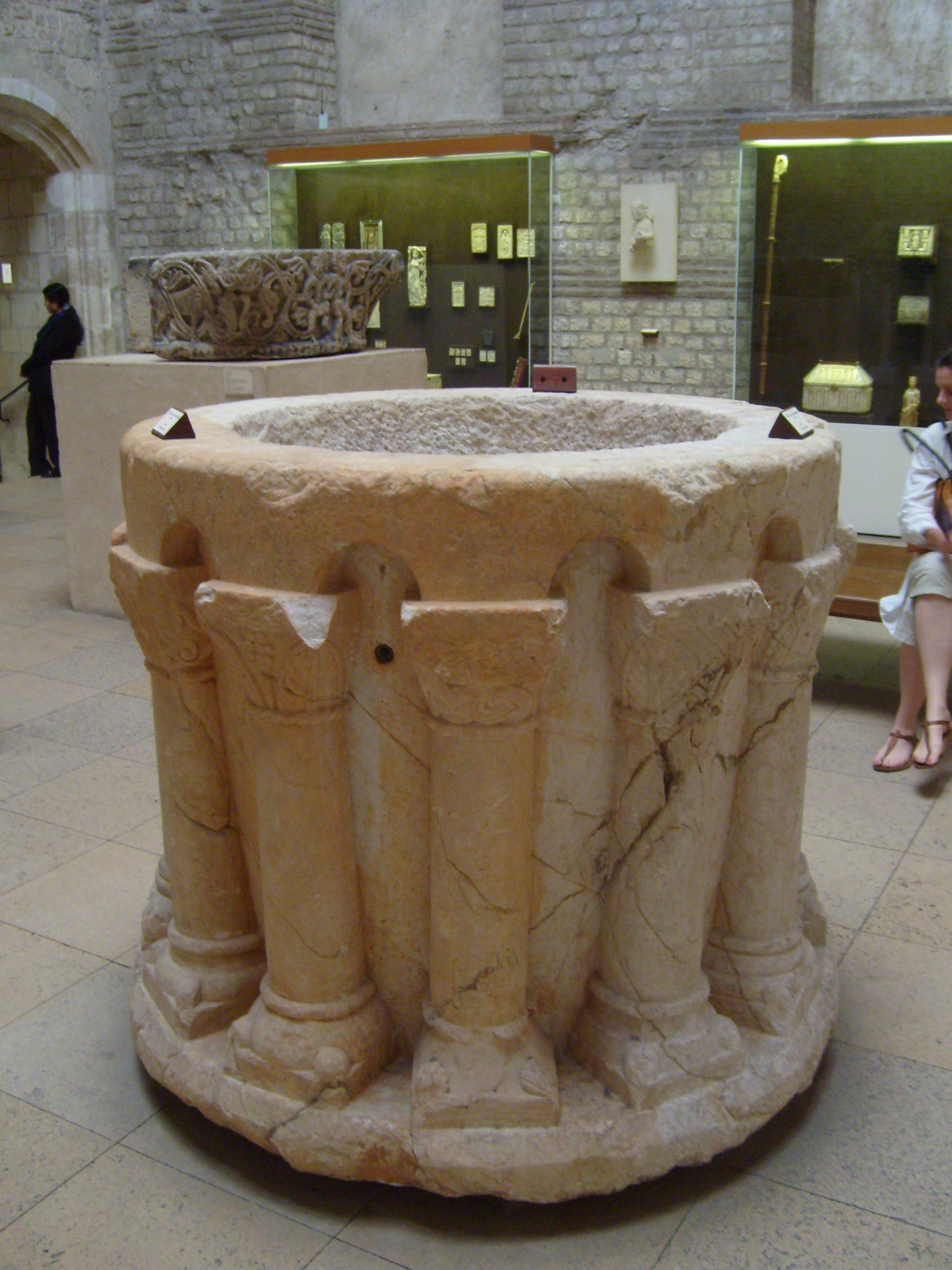
Vasque of a cloister fountain from the last quarter of the 12th century, from the Priory of Saint-Michel-de-Grandemont in Languedoc, France. (Cluny Museum, Paris)

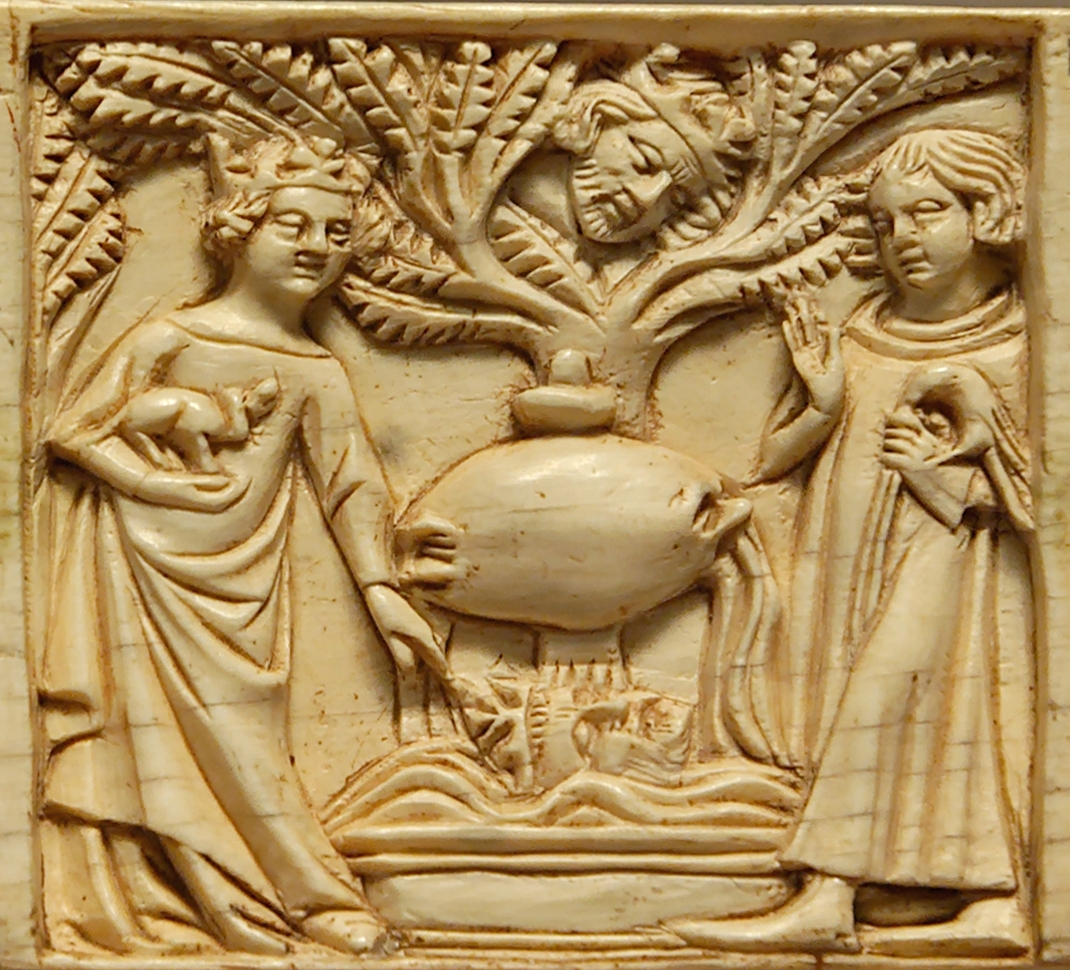
An ivory casket carving showing Tristan and Iseult next to a fountain (1340–50) (The Louvre)

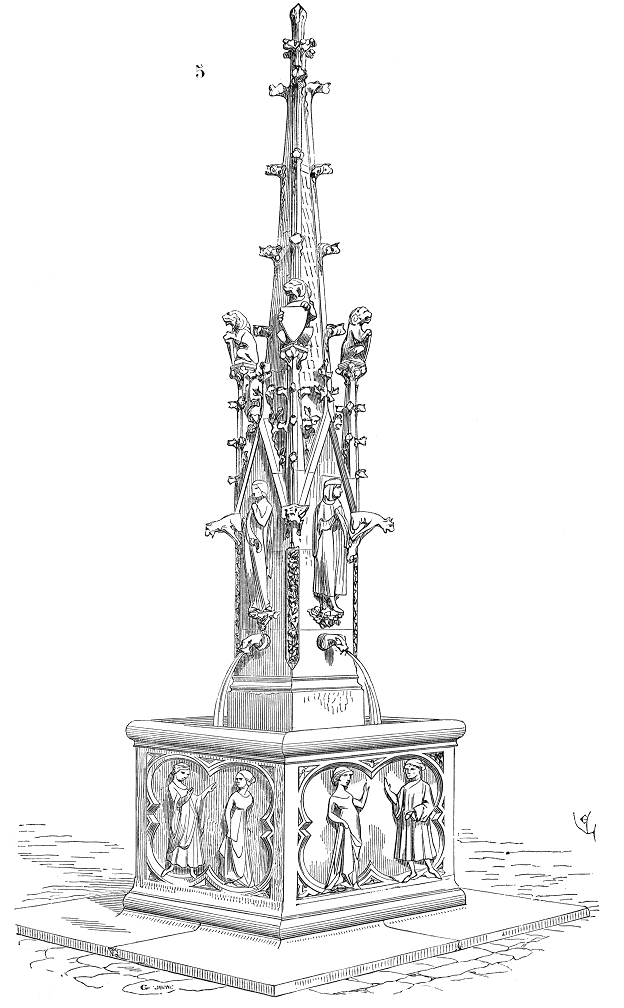
15th-century fountain drawn by Viollet-le-Duc

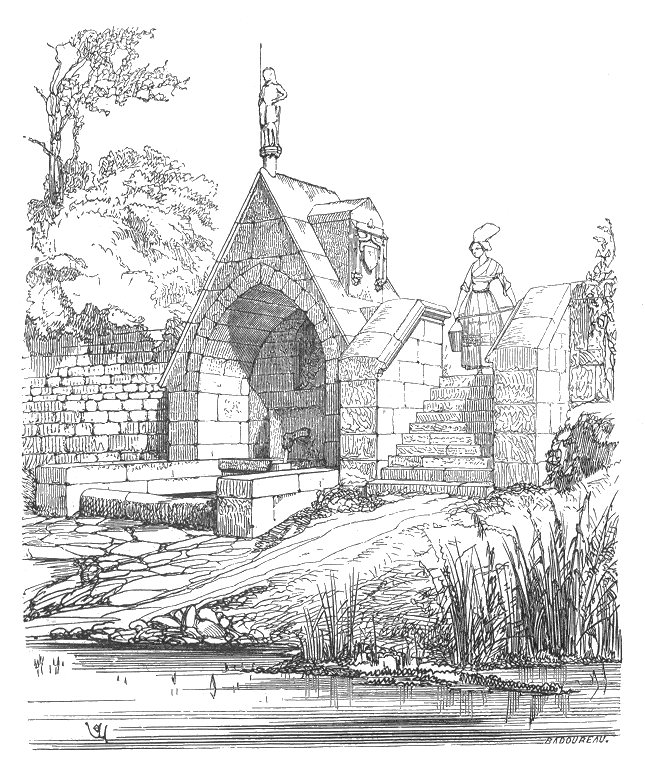
A rural medieval fountain drawn by Viollet-le-Duc

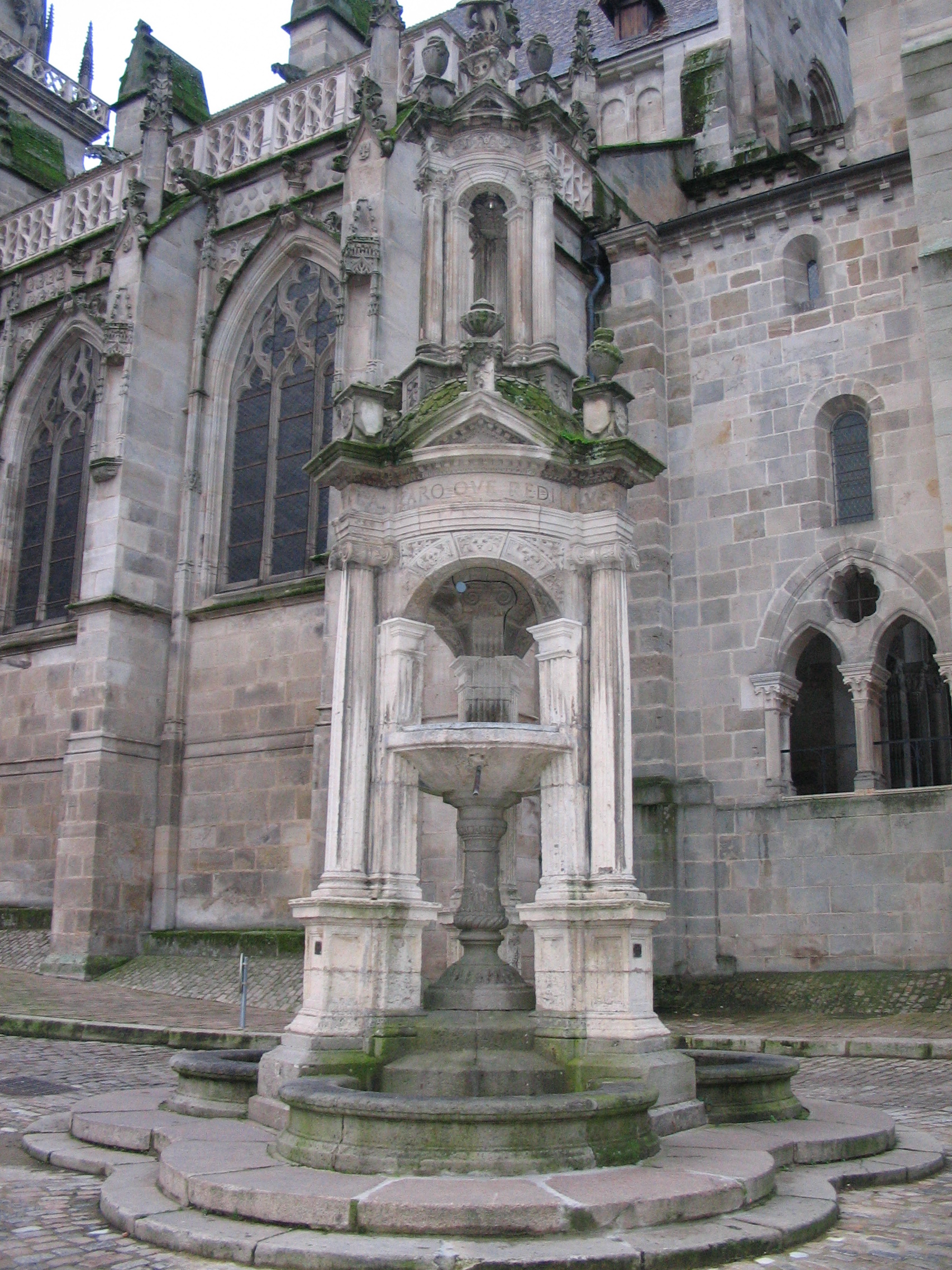
Fontaine Saint-Lazar (1543) in Autun (Saône-et-Loire)

== French Village Fountains ==
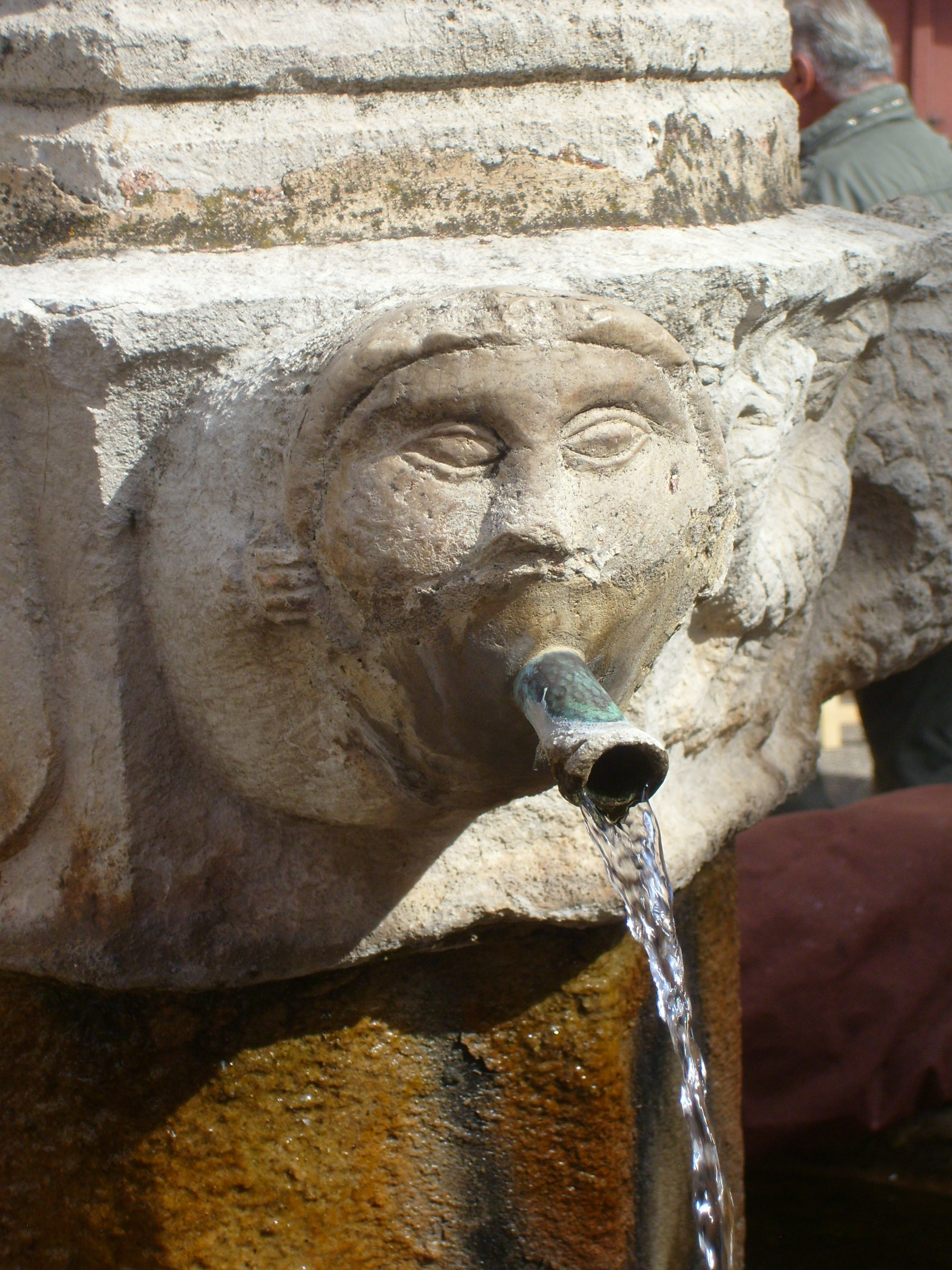
Mascaron of the fountain in Basse-sur-Issole, dated 1542.

While few fountains were built in French cities, where water was usually taken directly from the river or from wells. many fountains were built in villages, particularly in Provence. These fountains were originally located just outside or at the entrance to a village, at a spring, or close by, connected by an underground gallery. They were often built on the same site as an earlier Roman fountain, and the same basic designs were used from medieval times until the 19th century. Wall fountains were built at the spring, or against the wall of the building. They had a reservoir of water which was filled by gravity, and then the water poured out spouts, or canons, which were often decorated with mascarons, or masks, in the form of the heads of humans, animals or monsters.

Later, in the 16th century, a more sophisticated version of the wall fountain appeared, based on the design of ancient Roman street fountains. These new fountains showed the wealth and prestige of the town or village. and were usually placed in the central square, near the church. Inside the buffet, or the wall behind the fountain, was a hollow chamber called the bassin de repartition, connected by a pipe to the source of water below. The canon of the fountain was connected with the basin, with its entrance just below the water level in the basin. As the water poured out the canon, it would create a siphon, drawing water up the pipe and keeping the bassin de repartition filled.

As the water poured out the canon, it would be captured in an earthenware jar and carried home. The water not taken this way went into a stone abreuvoir, or basin, where it could be drunk by cattle, sheep or horses. The overflow water went then into a separate basin, a lavoir, where it could be used for washing clothes. The overflow water was then used for irrigating gardens. Since the traditional village way of washing clothes was to use wood cinders as a detergent, which were rich in potassium, the wash water was an efficient fertilizer for the gardens.

Another common village fountain design beginning in the 16th century was the fontaine ronde à fût, or barrel fountain. This type of fountain was illustrated on ancient Greek vases from the 6th century B.C. The fountain was free-standing, in the center of a square. It was composed of a circular stone basin, in the center of which was a stone column with a hollow cavity in the center for the bassin de repartition, connected to one or more canons. As the water poured from the canons, water was drawn by a siphon effect from the pipe below, keeping the bassin filled. The top of the fountain was covered by a stone cap, or couvercle, which could be removed to service the fountain.

A third common type of village fountain was the fontaine à bulbe, or bulb fountain. The bulb fountain operated in the same way as the barrel fountain, except that the bassin de repartition was located in a separate stone container, usually bulb shape, placed on top of column. The canons of the fountain were attached to the bulb rather than the column. The masks through which the water flowed were frequently carved directly onto the stone of the bulb.

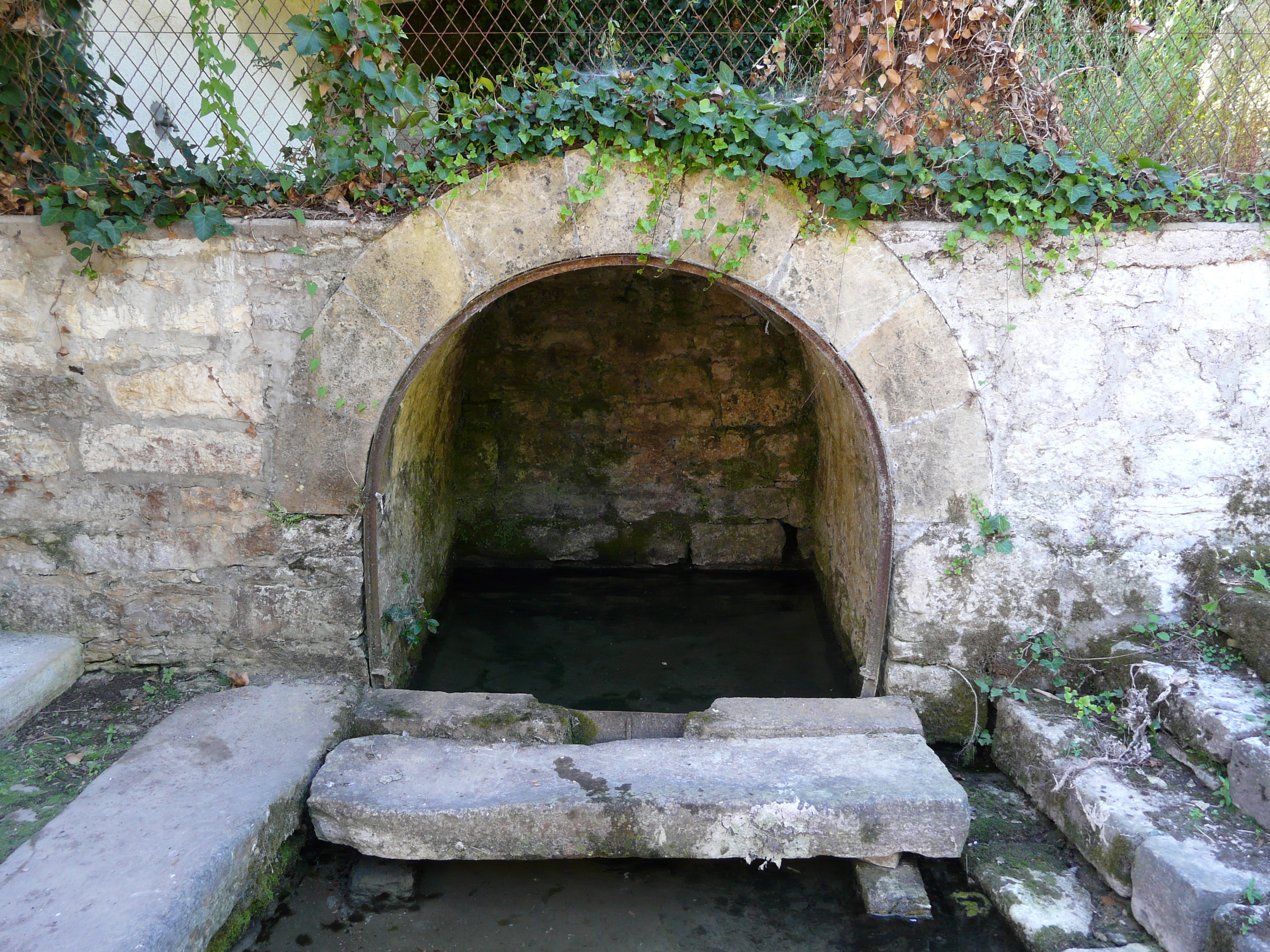
Fountain in Tourtoirac (Dordogne), probably dating to Roman times or earlier. The inhabitants have built a wall around a spring.

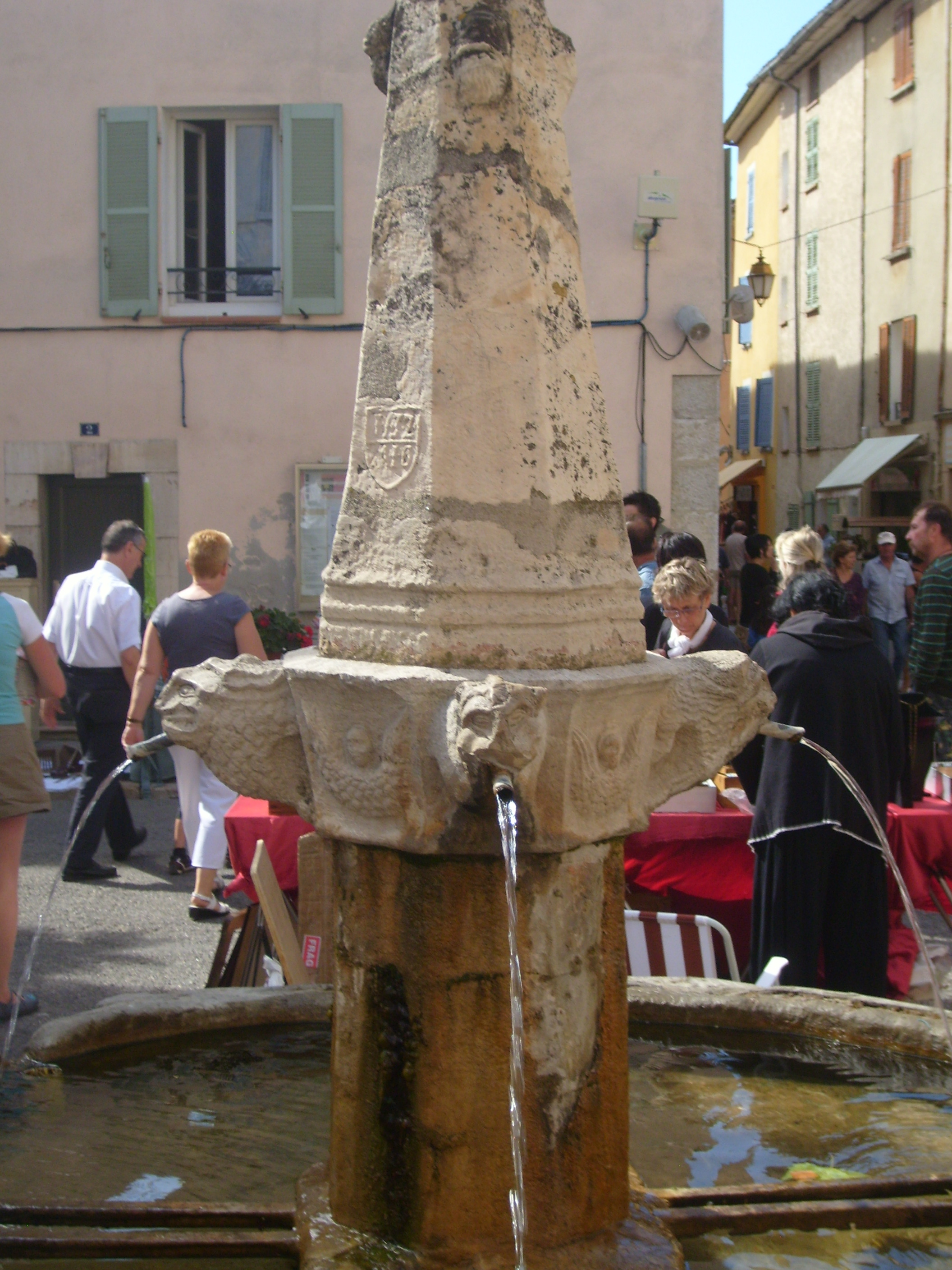
Barrel fountain in Basse-sur-Issole (1542). The iron rods over the fountain were designed to support jars and jugs as they were filled with water pouring from canons above.

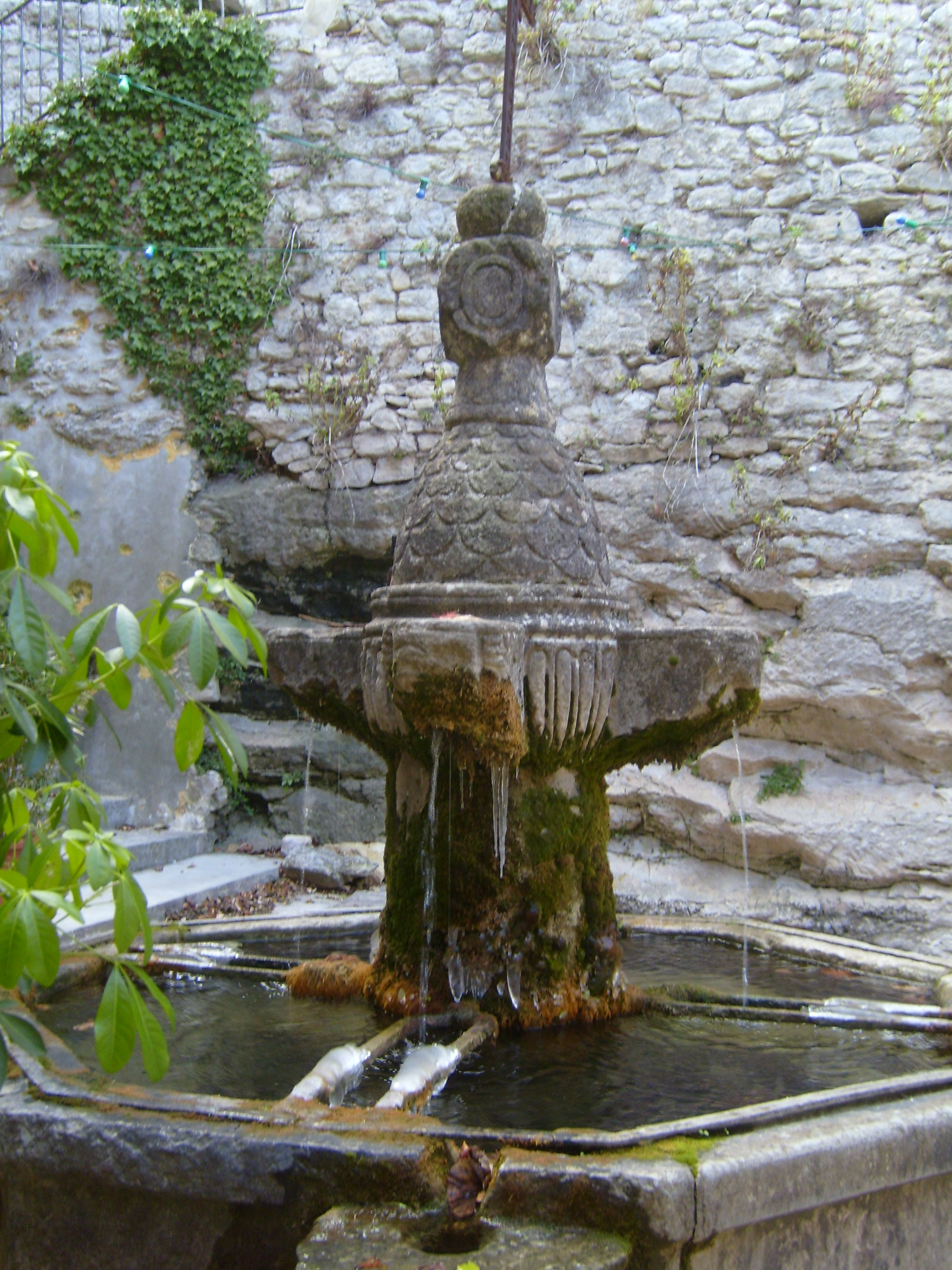
Fountain in the hilltop village of Crestet, in the Vaucluse (1588)

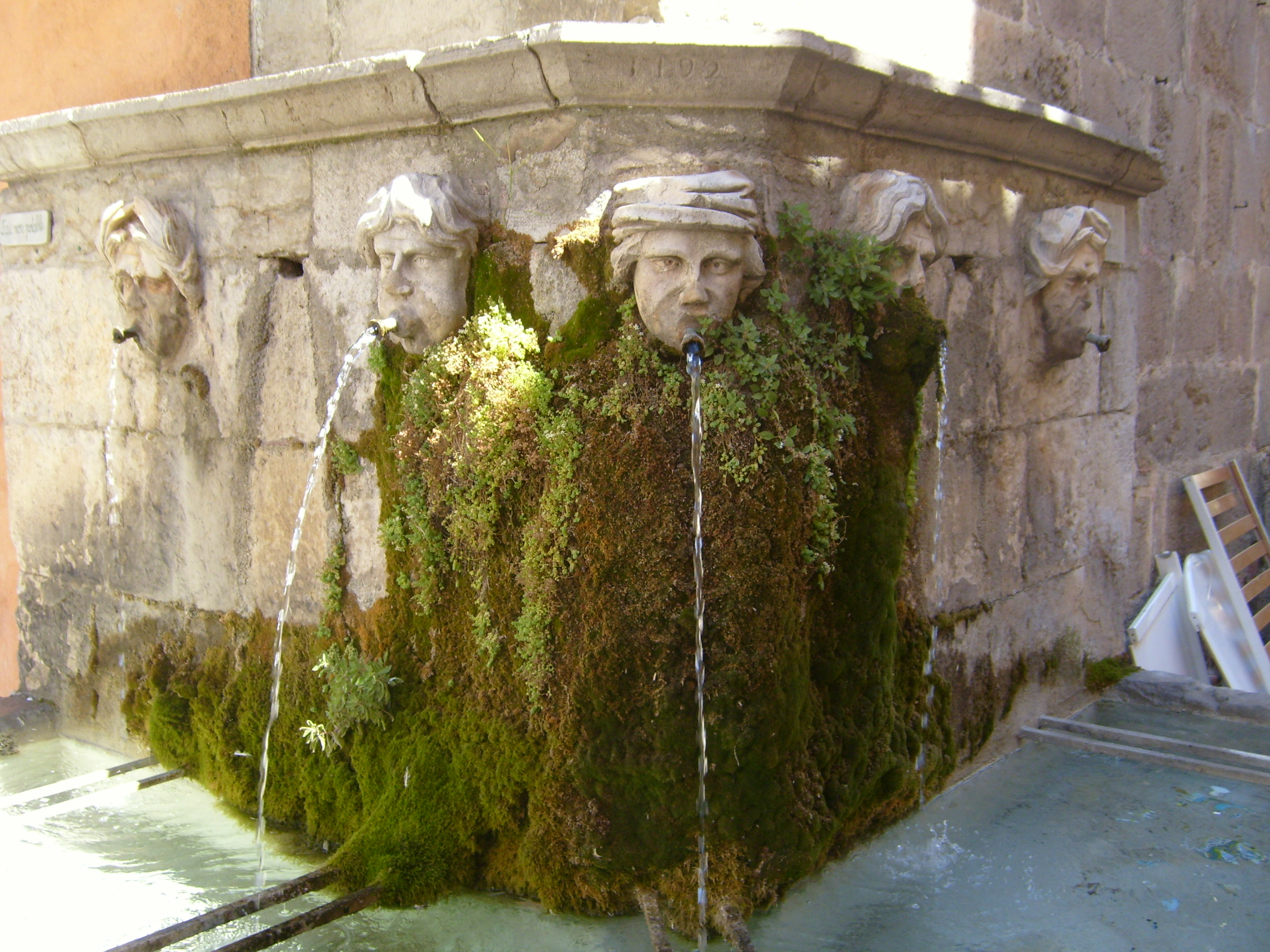
Corner wall fountain on the church in Tourves (Var), dated 1792.

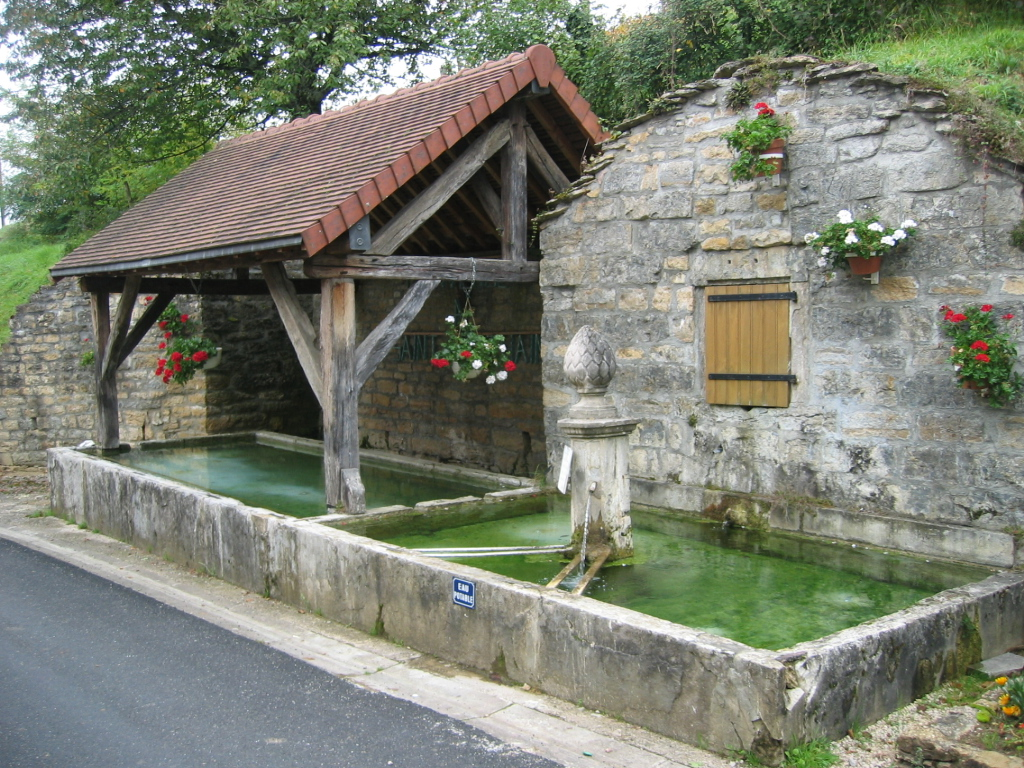
Village fountain and lavoir (washing basin) in Saint-Lothain (Jura)

== French Renaissance ==
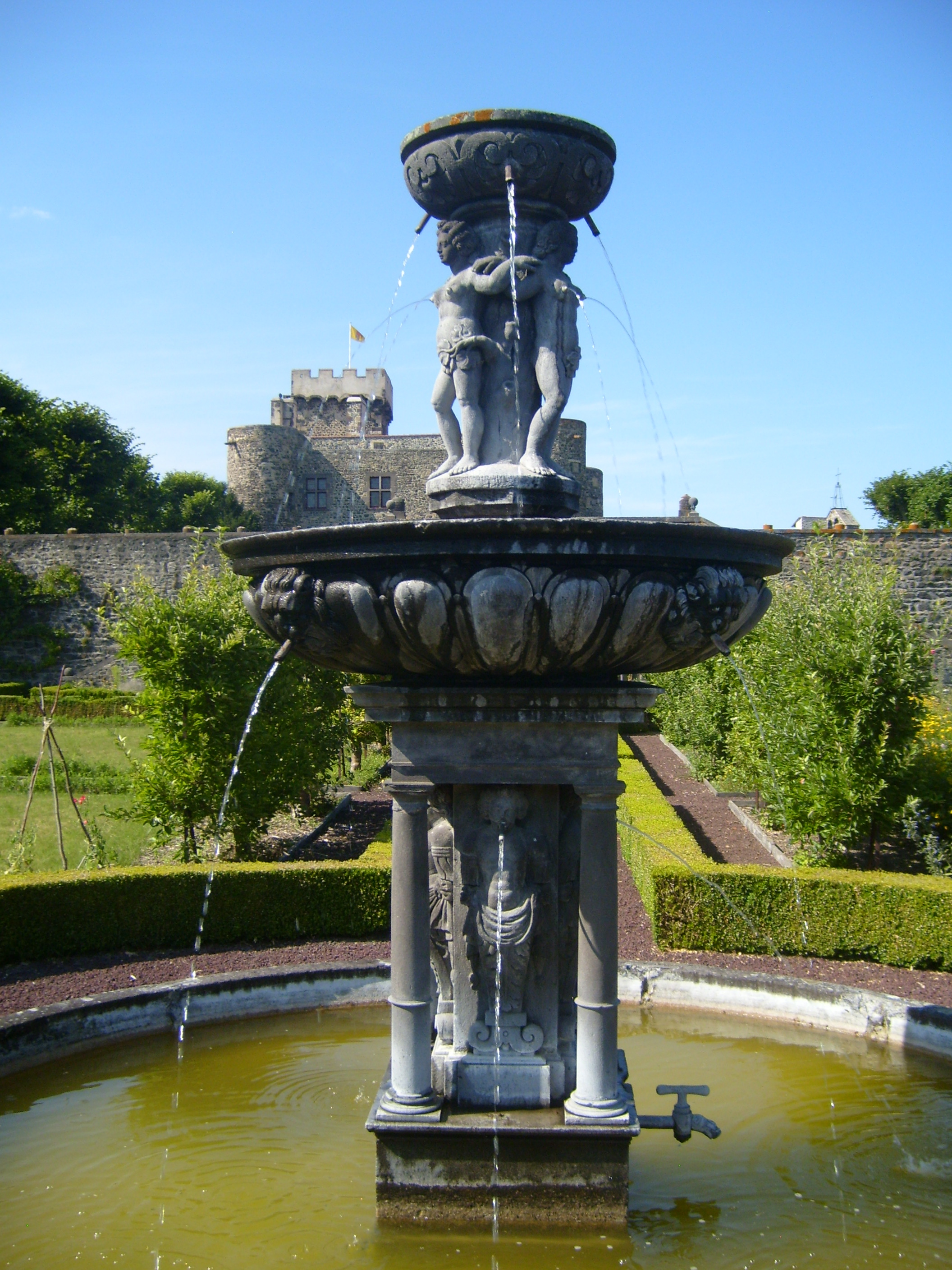
Fountain of the Château d'Opme, in the Auvergne (1617), attributed to Jean Androuet du Cerceau

The Italian Renaissance introduced a new kind of fountain to Europe, where the sculpture and decoration were as important as the water they supplied. They became works of art, and not just of engineering.

Between 1546 and 1549, the merchants of Paris built the first Renaissance-style fountain in Paris, the Fontaine des Innocents, to commemorate the ceremonial entry of King Henry II of France into the city. The fountain, which originally stood against the wall of the church of the Holy Innocents, was moved and rebuilt several times and now stands in a square near Les Halles. It is the oldest fountain in Paris.

Henry constructed an Italian-style garden with a fountain shooting a vertical jet of water for his favorite mistress, Diane de Poitiers, next to the Château de Chenonceau (1556–1559). At the royal Château de Fontainebleau, he built another fountain with a bronze statue of Diane, goddess of the hunt, modeled after Diane de Poitiers.

Later, after the death of Henry II, his widow, Catherine de' Medici, expelled Diana de Poitiers from Chenonceau and built her own fountain and garden there.

King Henry IV of France made an important contribution to French fountains by inviting an Italian hydraulic engineer, Tommaso Francini, who had worked on the fountains of the villa at Pratalino, to make fountains in France. Francini became a French citizen in 1600, built the Medici Fountain, and during the rule of the young King Louis XIII, he was raised to the position of Intendant général des Eaux et Fontaines of the King, a position which was hereditary. His descendants became the royal fountain designers for Louis XIII and for Louis XIV at Versailles.

The Renaissance style spread widely in France, as noblemen and members of court transformed their castles into Renaissance-style residences and laid out gardens and fountains. One example is found at the Château d'Opme, in the Auvergne near Clermont-Ferrand, where the treasurer of King Louis XIII, built a garden and a fountain, designed by Jean Androuet du Cerceau.

In 1630 another Medici, Marie de' Medici, the widow of Henry IV, built her own monumental fountain in Paris, the Medici Fountain, in the garden of the Palais du Luxembourg. That fountain still exists today, with a long basin of water and statues added in 1866.

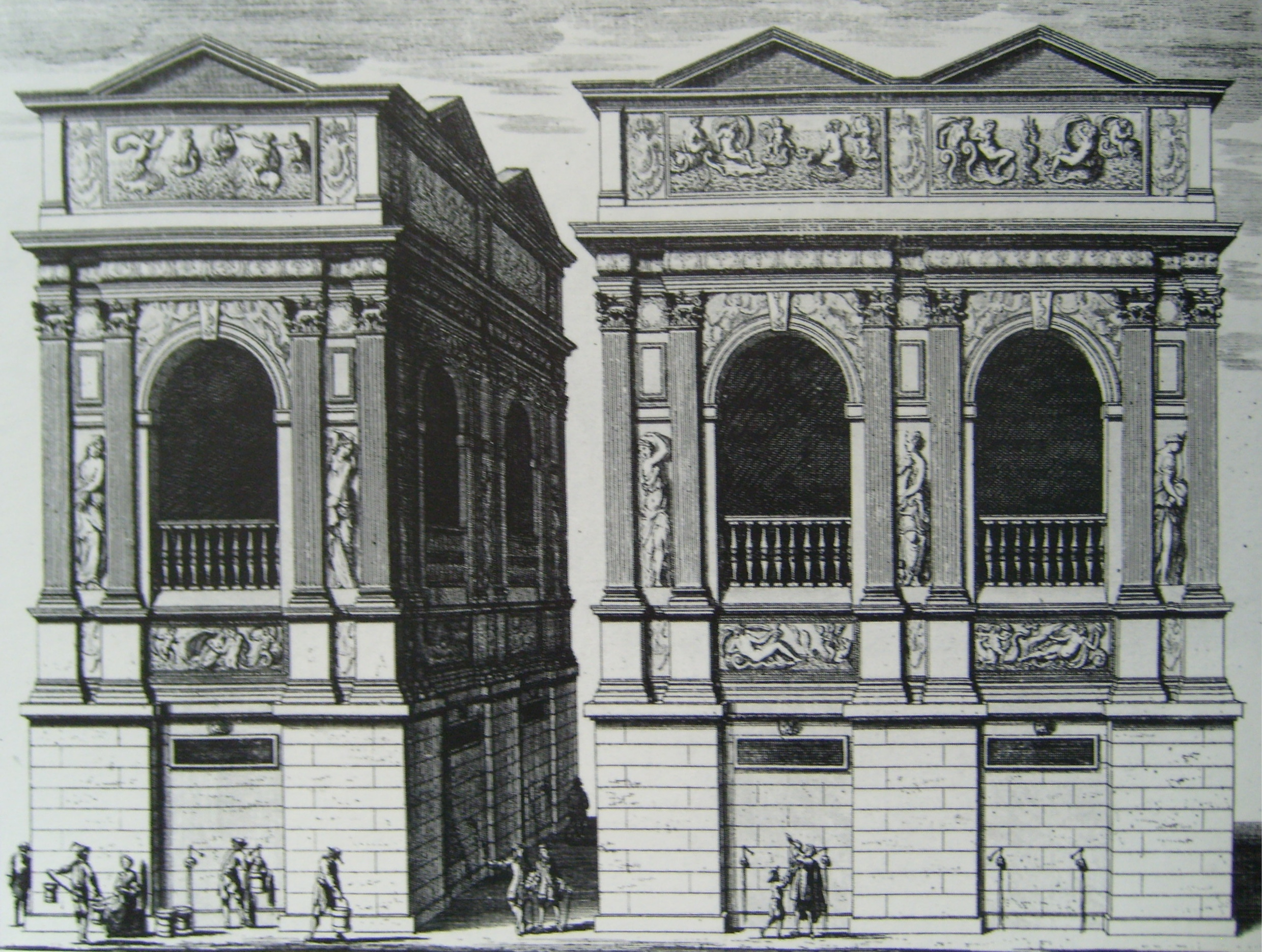
Front and side views of the Fontaine des Innocents in Paris (1546–1549) in its original form

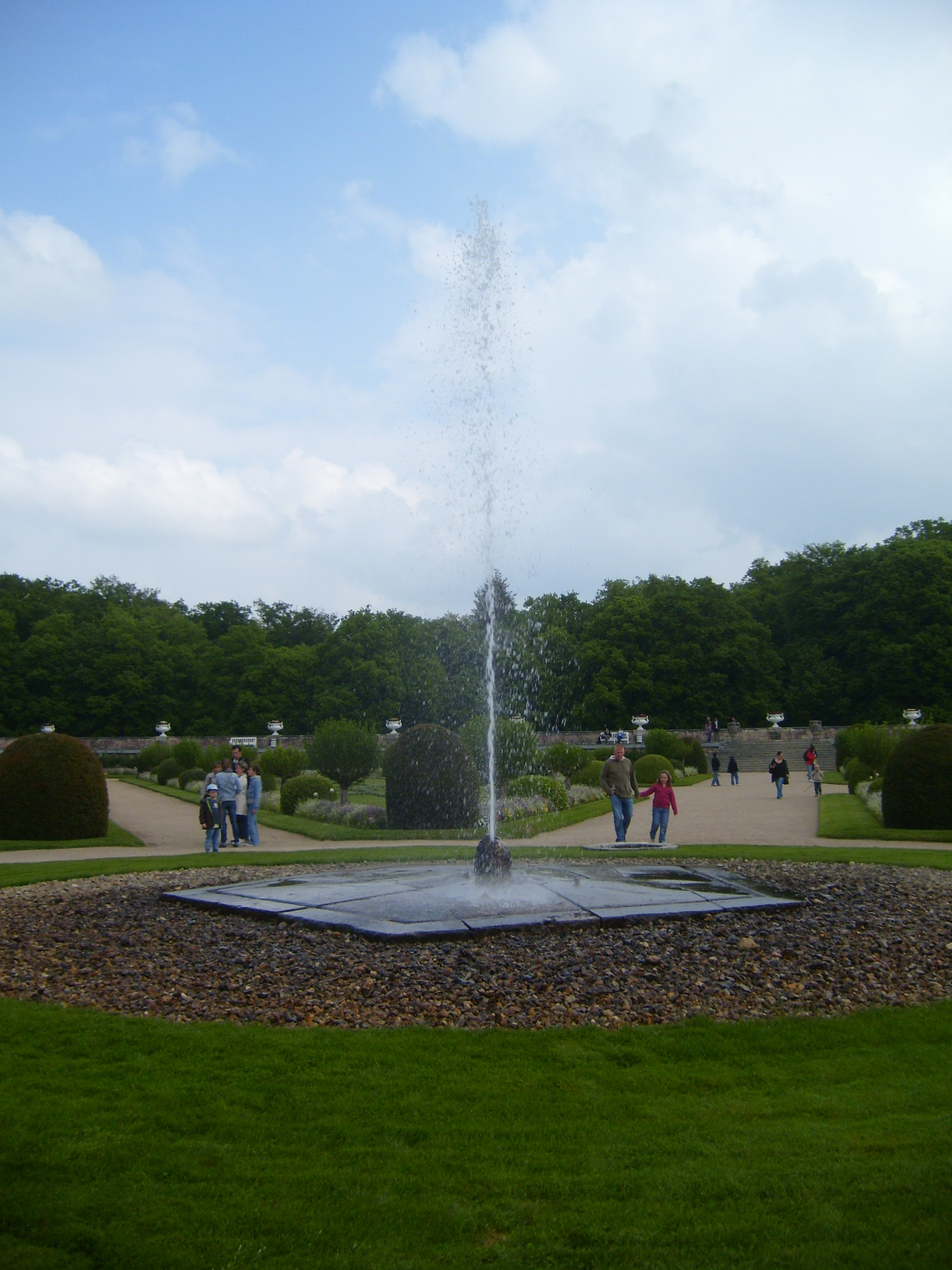
Fountain of Diane de Poitiers in the gardens of the Château de Chenonceau (1556–1559)

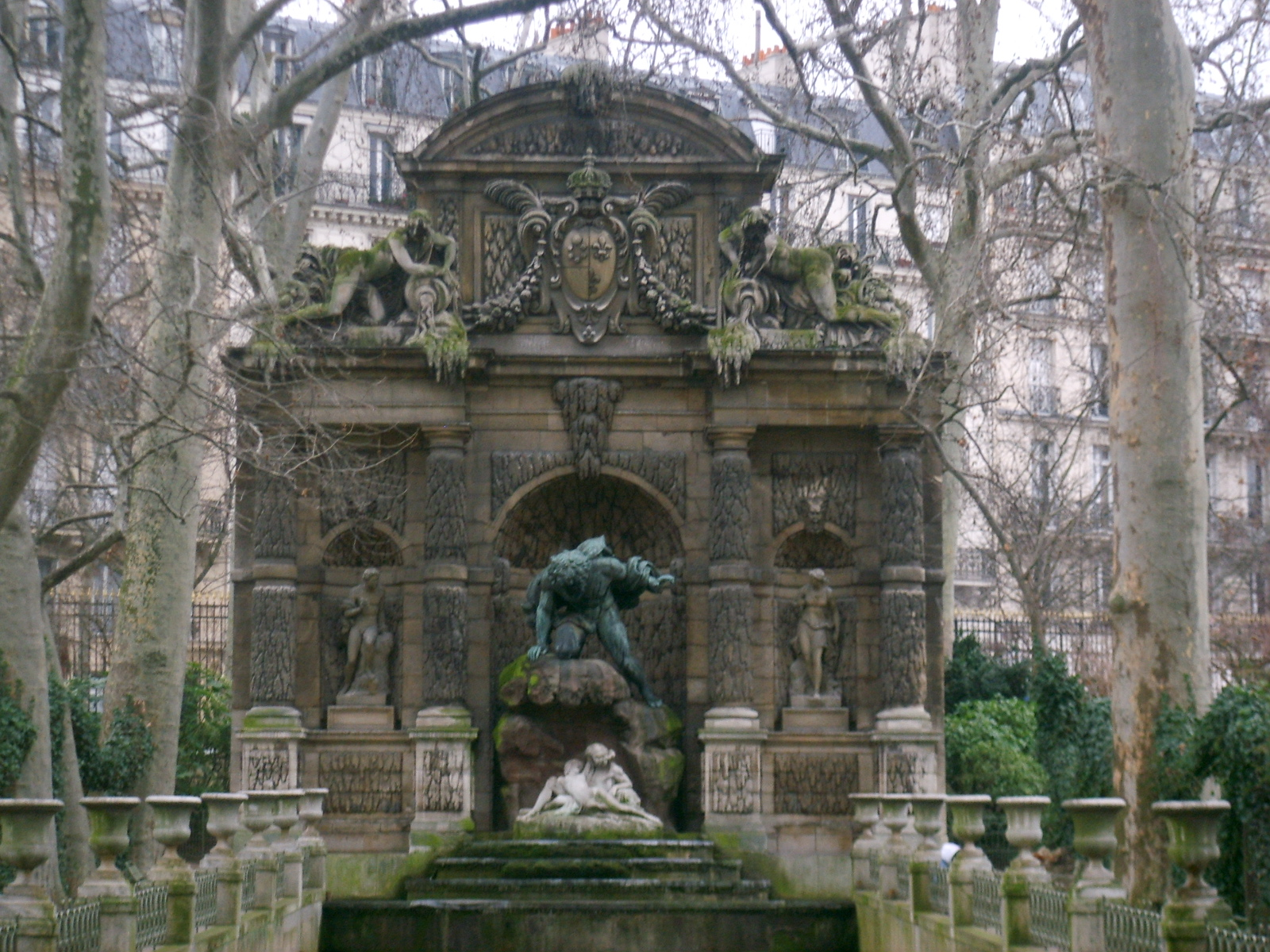
The Medici Fountain, Paris (1630)

== French Baroque fountains ==
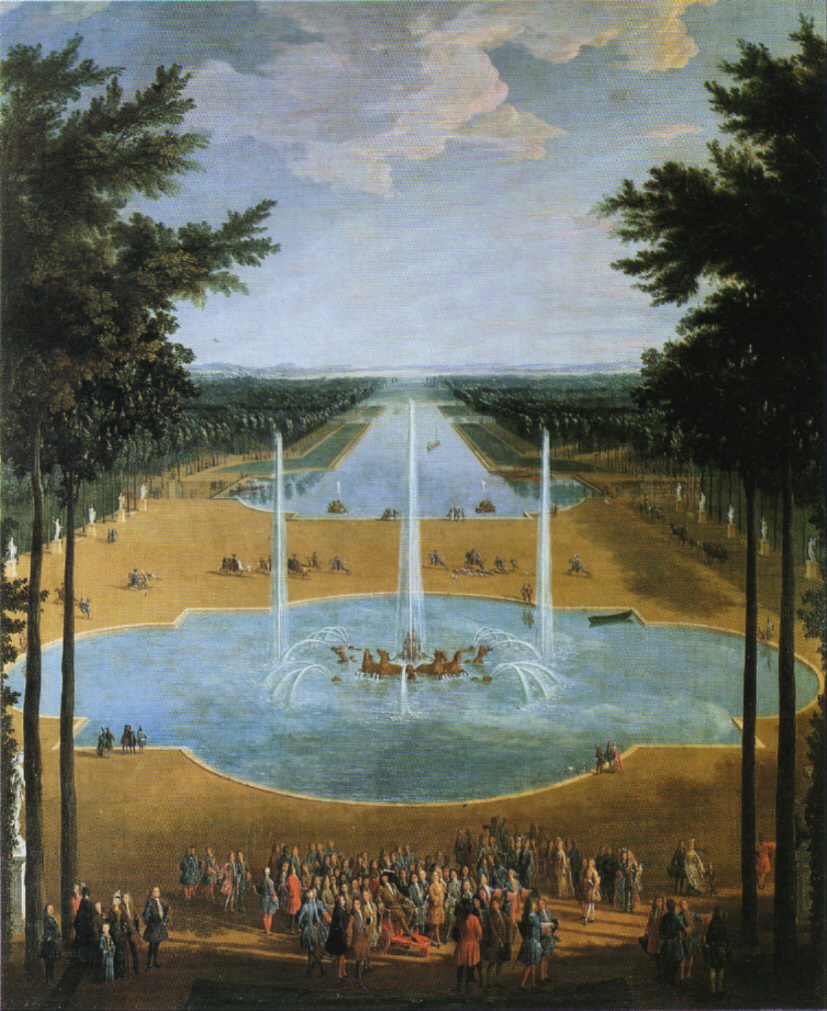
The Bassin d'Apollon at Versailles as it appeared in 1714

In 1662, King Louis XIV began to build a new kind of garden, the Garden à la française, or French formal garden, at the Palace of Versailles. In this garden, the fountain played a central role. He used fountains to demonstrate the power of man over nature, and to illustrate the grandeur of his rule. In the Gardens of Versailles, instead of falling naturally into a basin, water was shot into the sky, or formed into the shape of a fan or bouquet. Dancing water was combined with music and fireworks to form a grand spectacle. These fountains were the work of the descendants of Tommaso Francini, the Italian hydraulic engineer who had come to France during the time of Henry IV and built the Medici Fountain and the Fountain of Diana at Fontainebleau.

Two fountains were the centerpieces of the Gardens of Versailles, both taken from the myths about Apollo, the sun god, the emblem of Louis XIV, and both symbolizing his power. The Fontaine Latone (1668–70) designed by André Le Nôtre and sculpted byGaspard and Balthazar Marsy, represents the story of how the peasants of Lycia tormented Latona and her children, Diana and Apollo, and were punished by being turned into frogs. This was a reminder of how French peasants had abused Louis's mother, Anne of Austria, during the uprising called the Fronde in the 1650s. When the fountain is turned on, sprays of water pour down on the peasants, who are frenzied as they are transformed into creatures.

The other centerpiece of the Gardens, at the intersection of the main axes of the Gardens of Versailles, is the Bassin d'Apollon (1668–71), designed by Charles Le Brun and sculpted by Jean Baptiste Tuby. This statue shows a theme also depicted in the painted decoration in the Hall of Mirrors of the Palace of Versailles: Apollo in his chariot about to rise from the water, announced by Tritons with seashell trumpets. Historians Mary Anne Conelli and Marilyn Symmes wrote, "Designed for dramatic effect and to flatter the king, the fountain is oriented so that the Sun God rises from the west and travels east toward the chateau, in contradiction to nature."

Besides these two monumental fountains, the Gardens over the years contained dozens of other fountains, including thirty-nine animal fountains in the labyrinth depicting the fables of Jean de La Fontaine.

There were so many fountains at Versailles that it was impossible to have them all running at once; when Louis XIV made his promenades, his fountain-tenders turned on the fountains ahead of him and turned off those behind him. Louis built an enormous pumping station, the Machine de Marly, with fourteen water wheels and 253 pumps to raise the water three hundred feet from the River Seine, and even attempted to divert the River Eure to provide water for his fountains, but the water supply was never enough.

(See Gardens of Versailles)

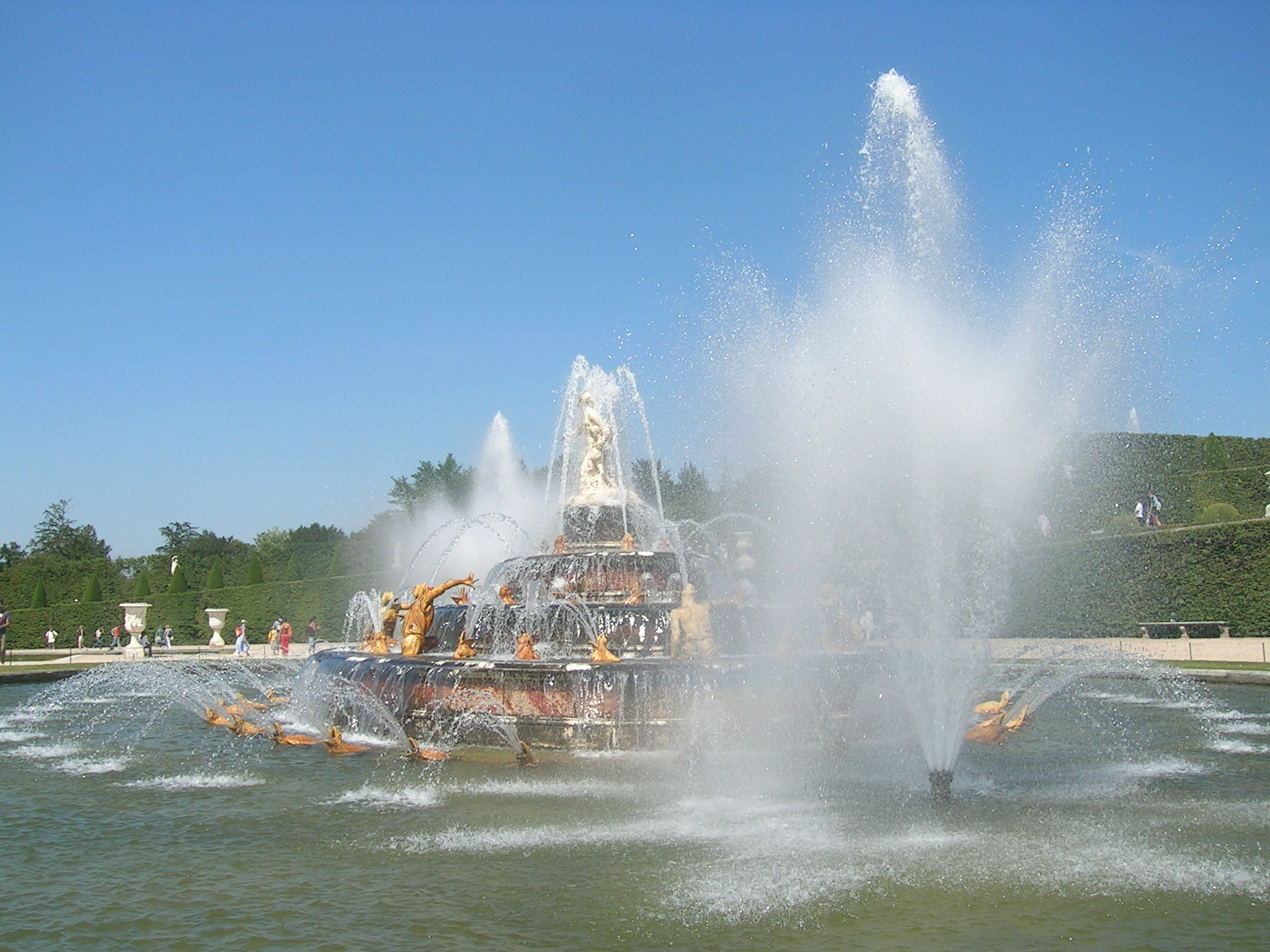
The Fontaine Latone in the Gardens of Versailles (1668–70)

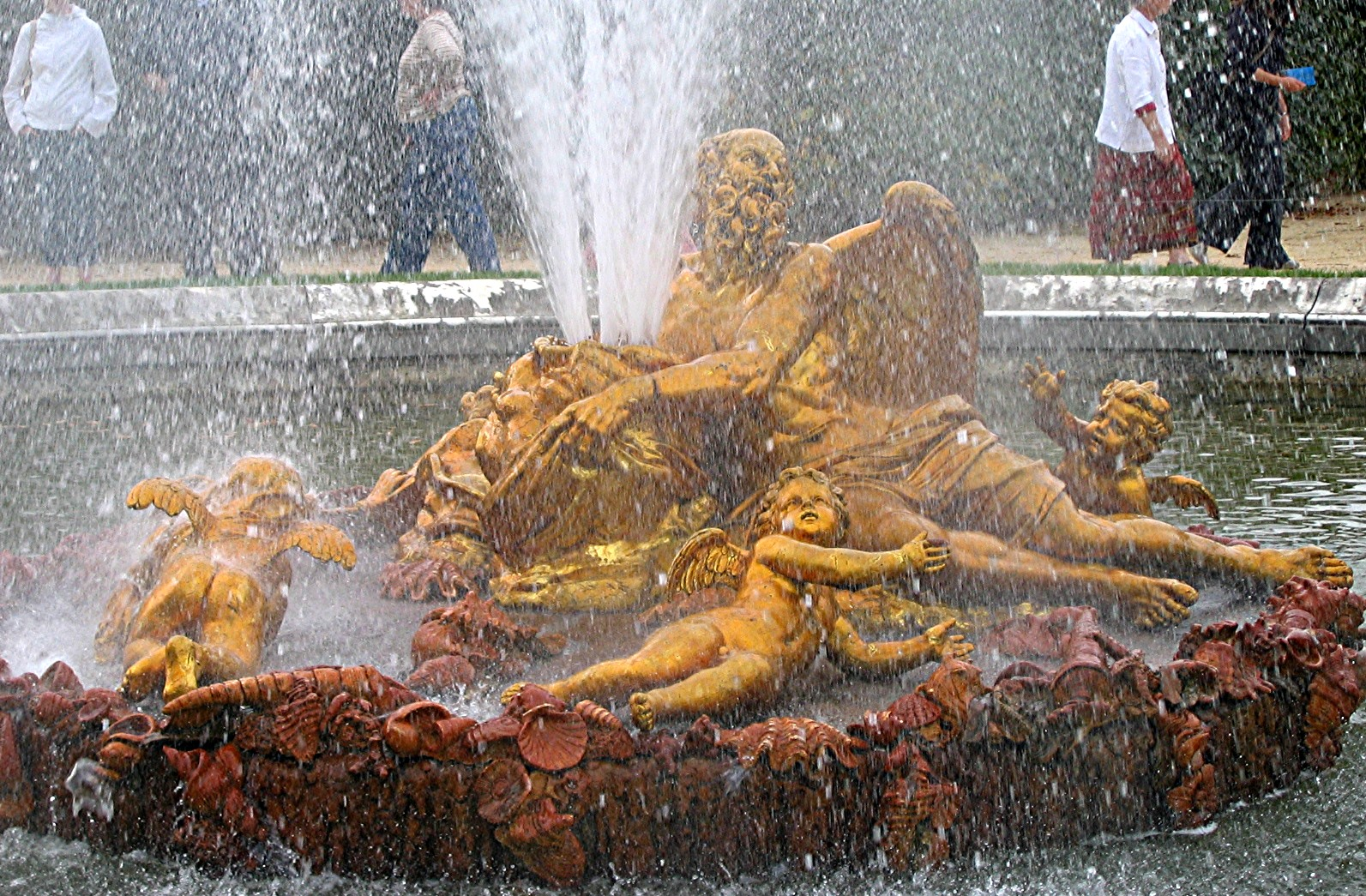
Fountain of the Basin of Saturn, representing winter, by François Girardon (1672–77)

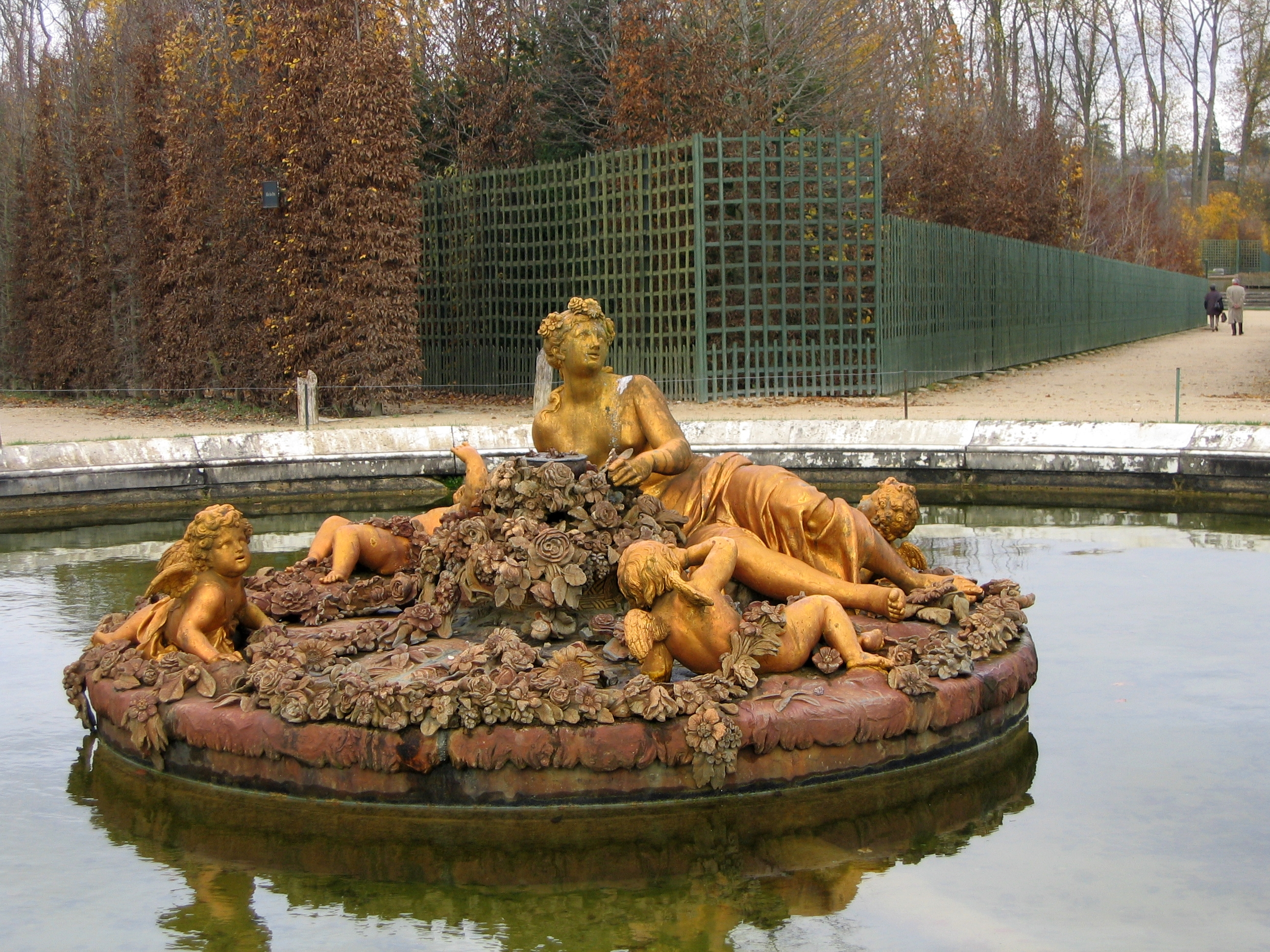
Fountain of the Bassin de Flore, representing spring, by Jean-Baptiste Tuby (1672–74)

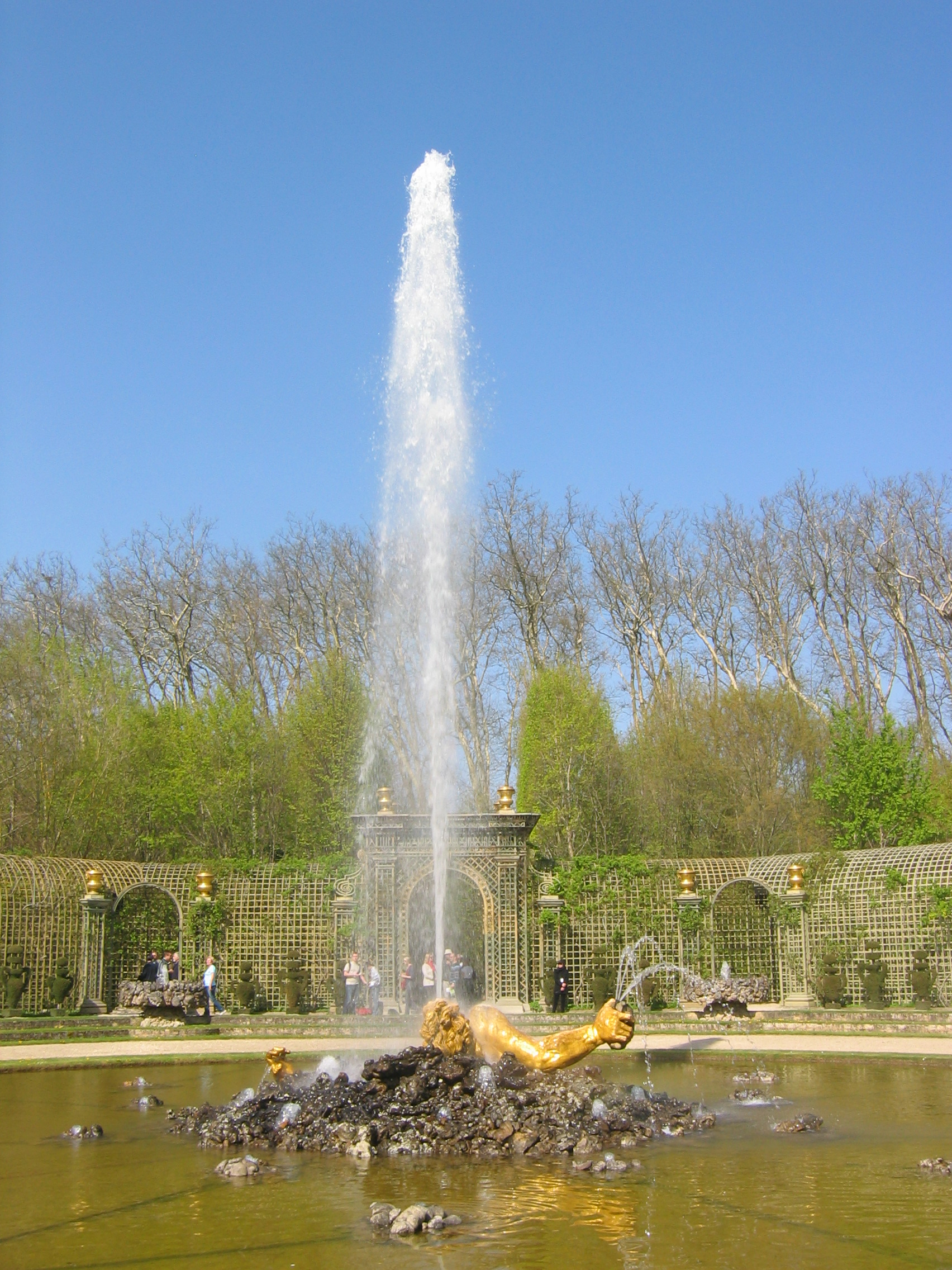
Fontaine de l'Encelade, b Gaspard Marsy (1675-1676)

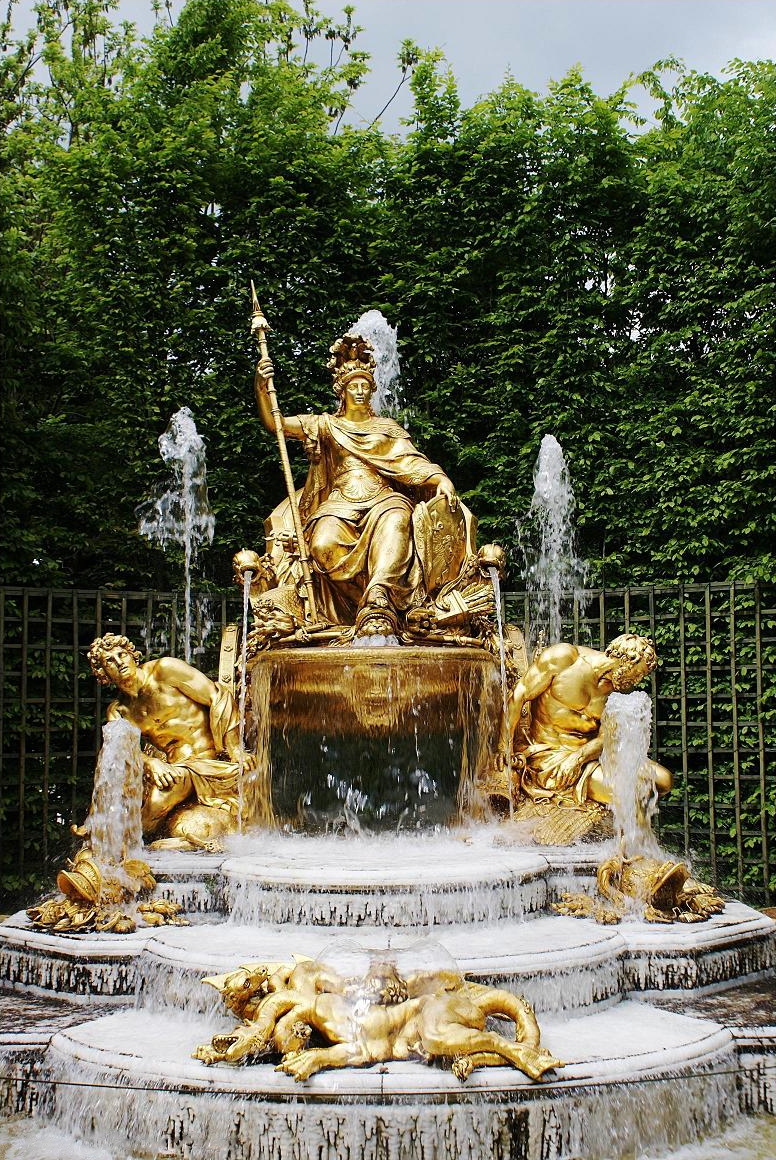
Fountain of the Bosquet de l'Arc de Triomphe

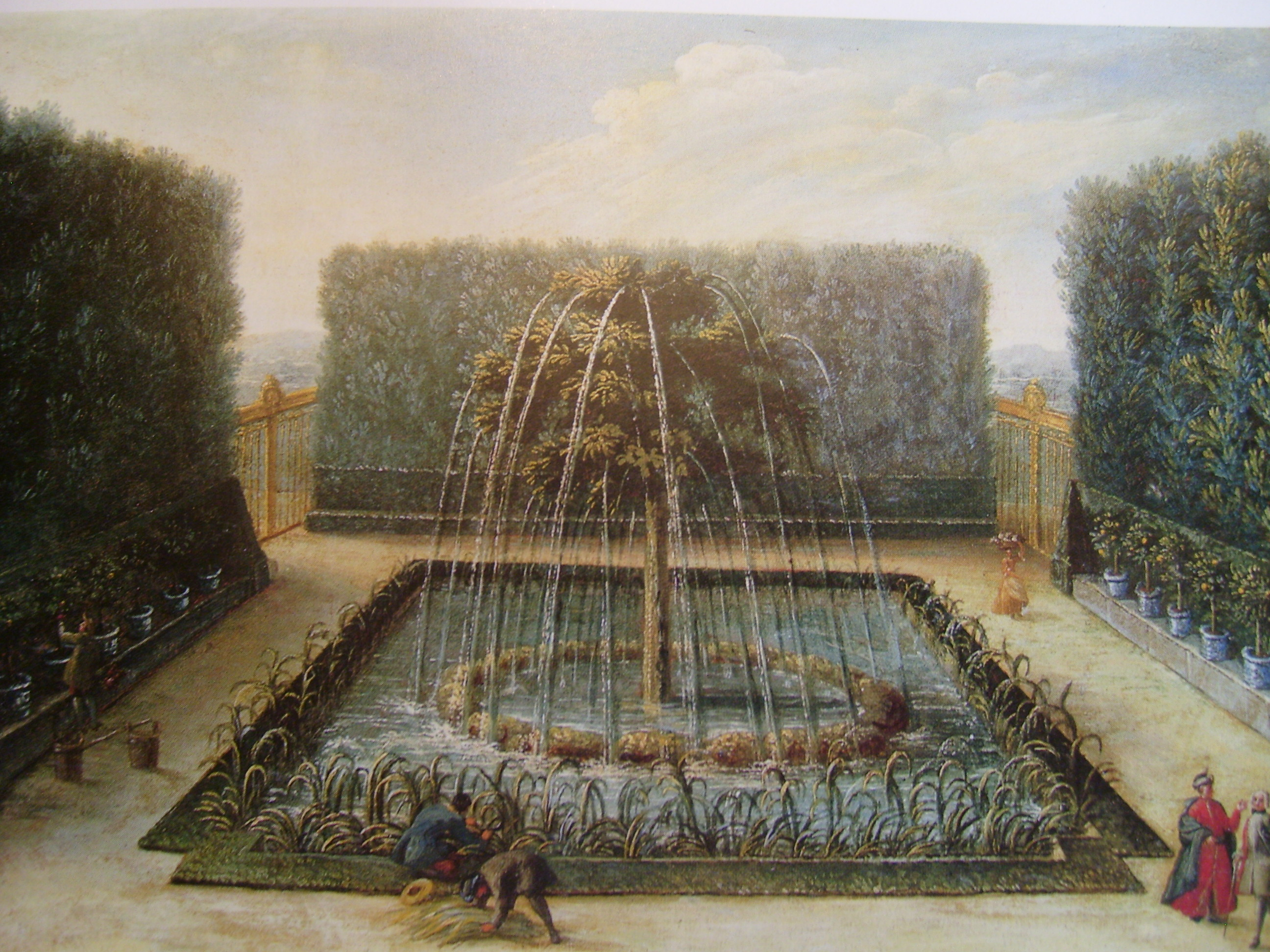
Fountain of the Bosquet du Marais

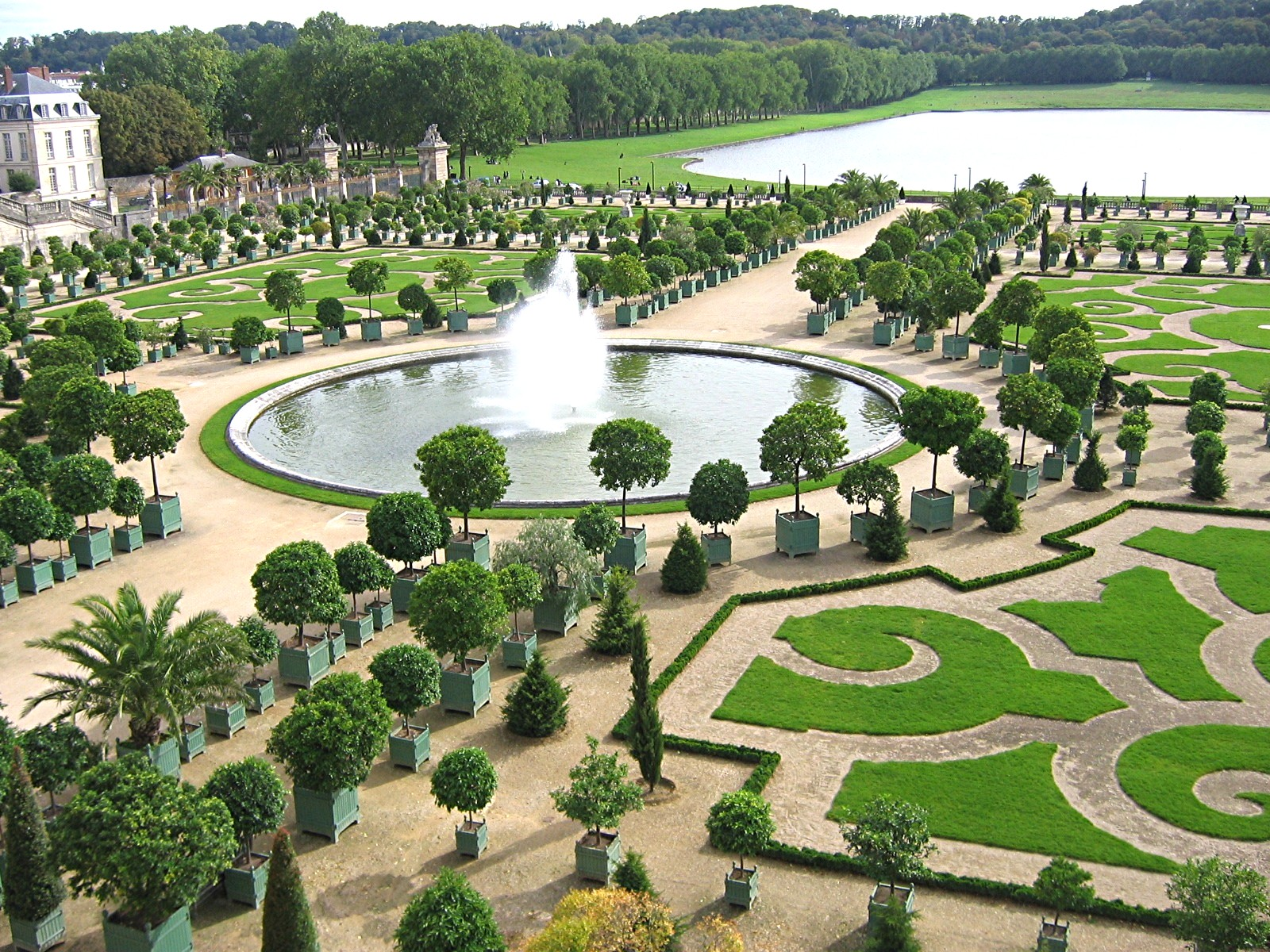
Fountain of the Orangerie, Versailles

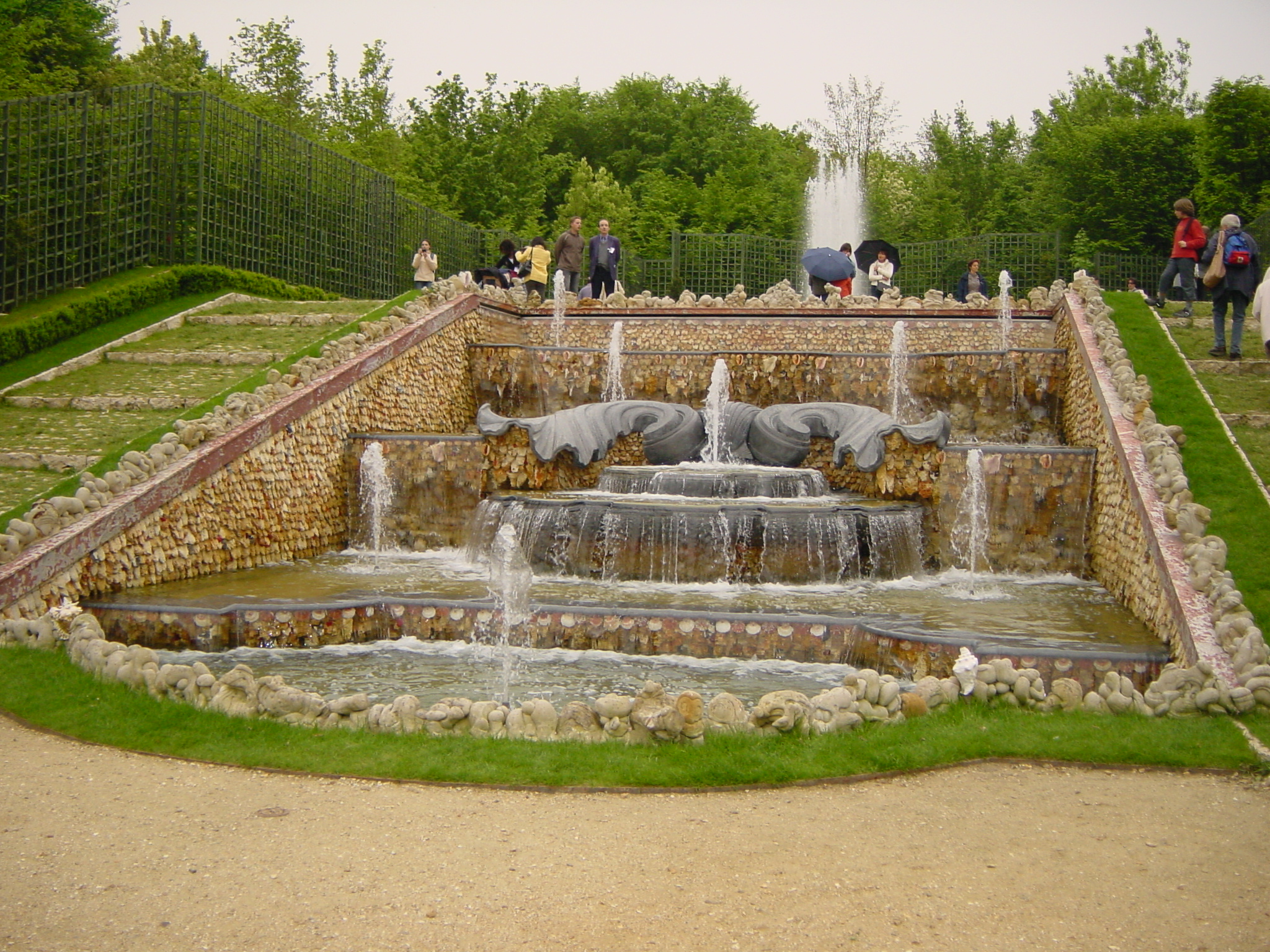
Bosquet of the Three Fountains, Versailles

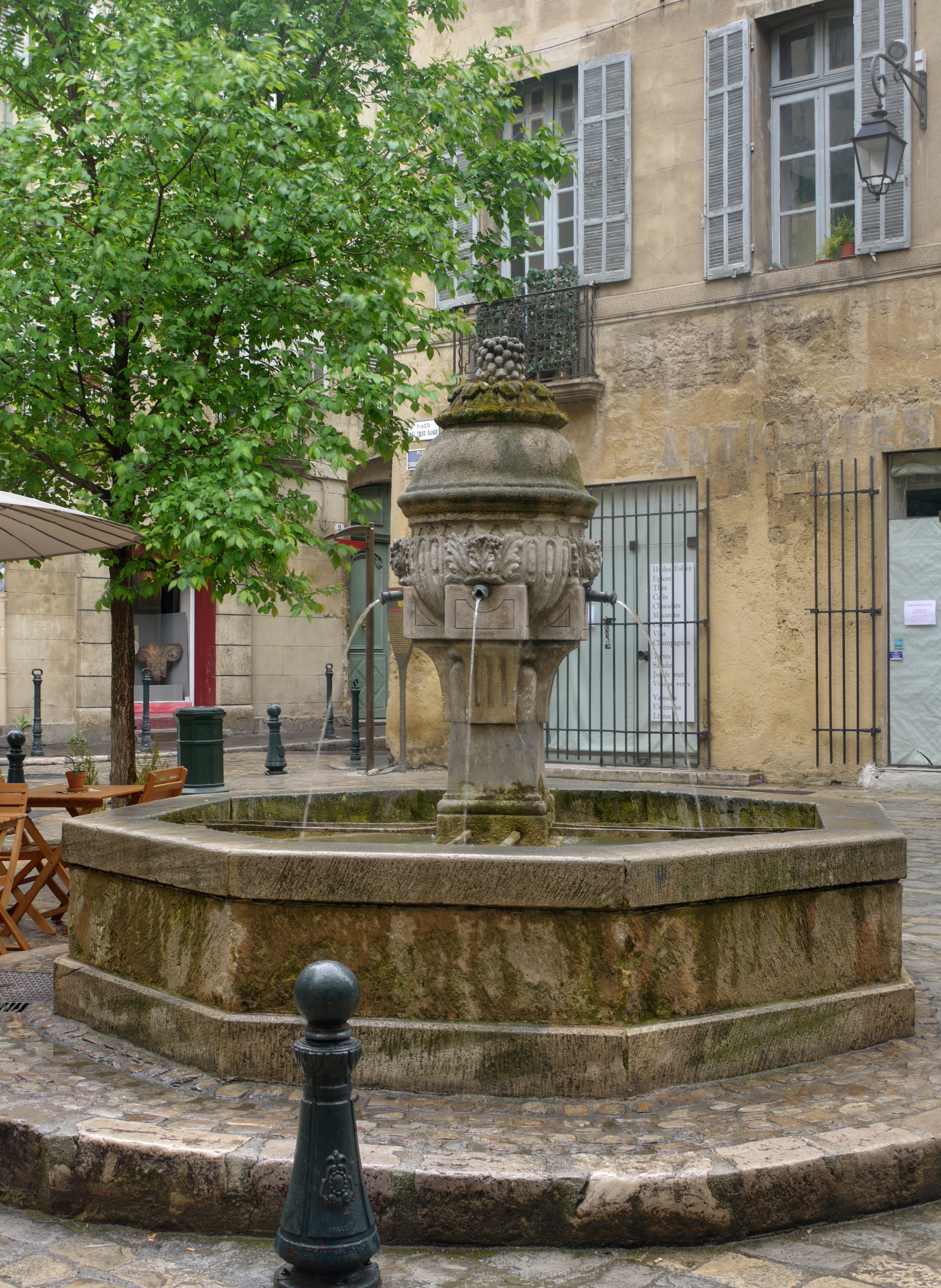
Fontaine des Trois Ormeaux, Aix-en-Provence (either 1625 or 1632), the oldest of the exceptional fountains of Aix-en-Provence.

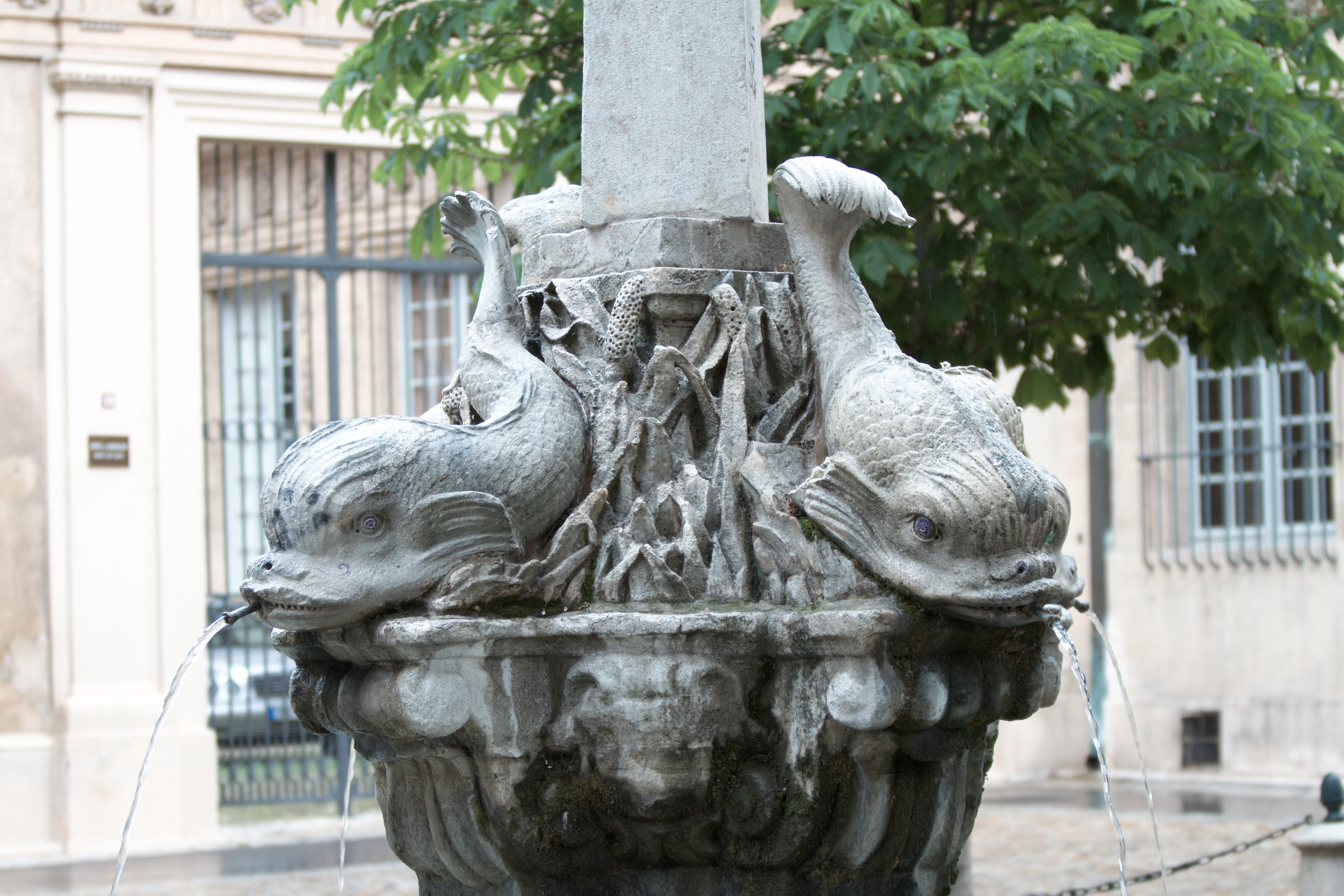
The Fontaine des Quatre Dauphins (Fountain of the Four Dolphins) (1667) in the Mazarin Quarter of Aix-en-Provence,

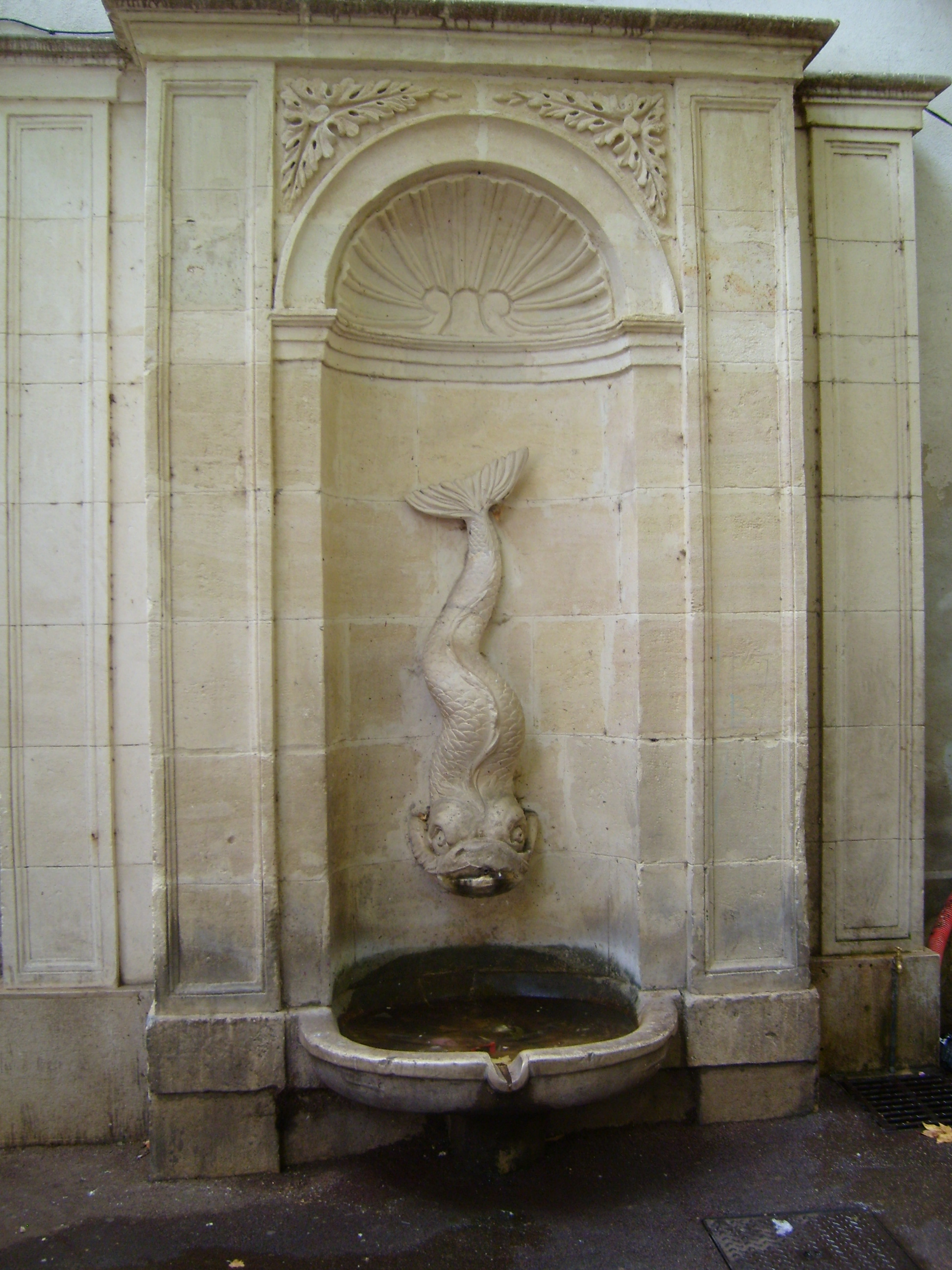
The dolphin was a popular subject in baroque fountains. The Fontaine du Dauphin, Place Paul Comte in Toulon. (Before 1668).

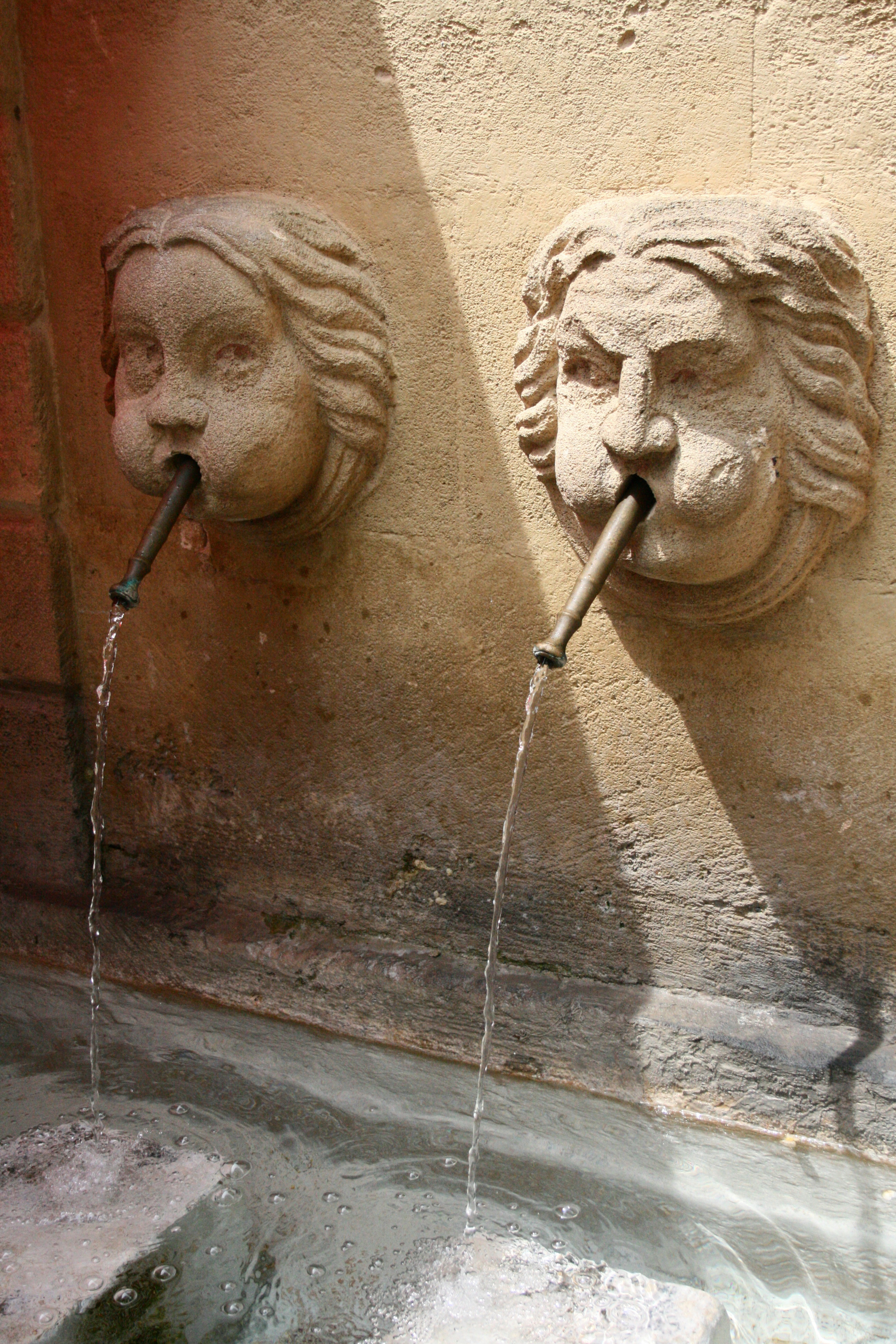
Fontaine des Bagniers, rue des Chapeliers, Aix-en-Provence (1687)

== 18th Century ==
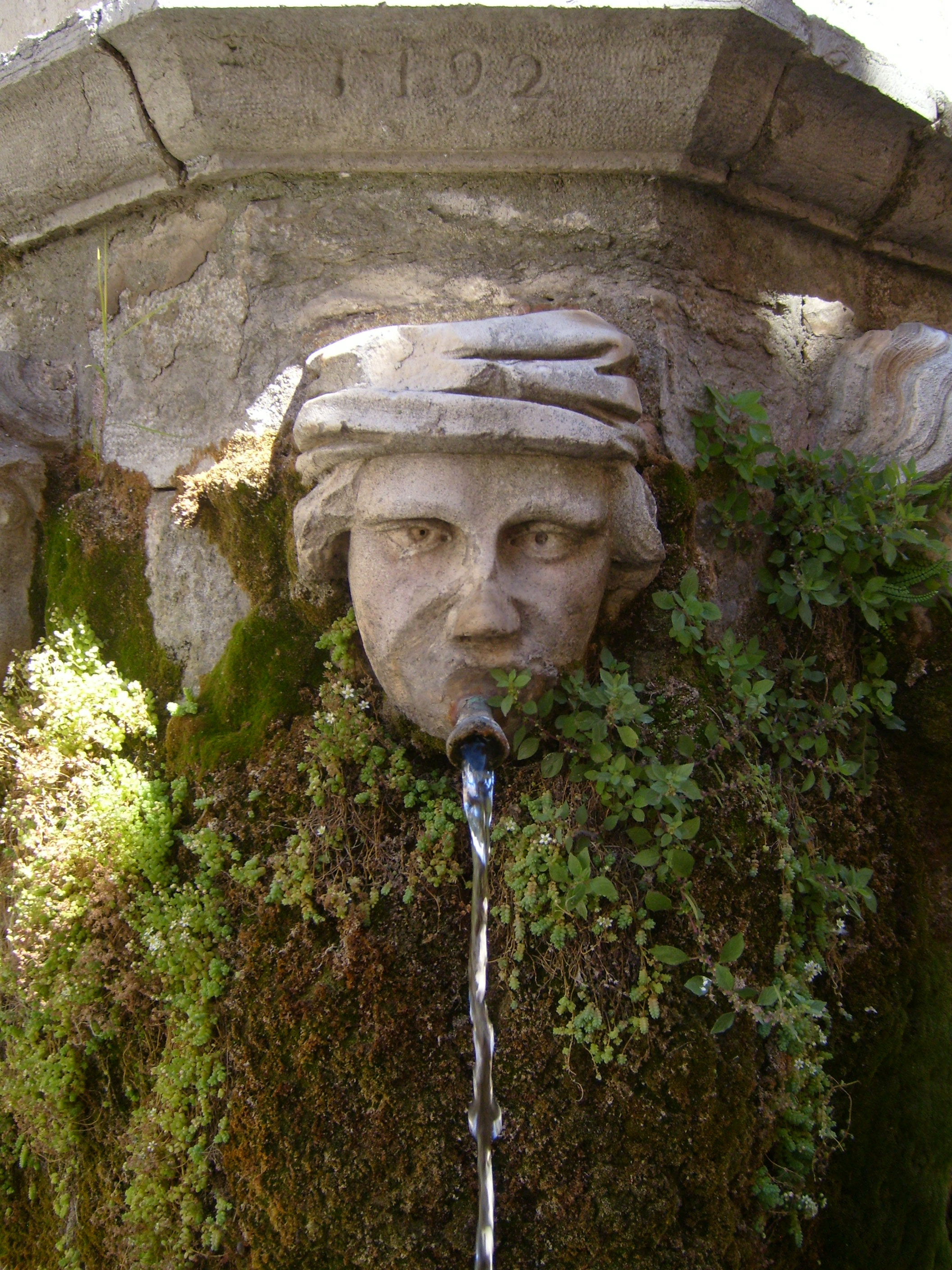
Mascaron of the fountain in Touvres, in the Var (1792). The mascaron came from the chateau of the Count of Valbelle, destroyed during the French Revolution.

The eighteenth century saw the construction of thirty new fountains in Paris, of which fourteen still survive, and the building of three châteaux d'eau, water reservoirs located inside large structures. Many of these fountains were the work of Jean Beausire, who, by royal edict, was Contrôleur des bâtiments of the city of Paris between 1692 and 1740. His fountains were usually small, set against a wall, with a niche and a single spout pouring water into a small basin, but they were dignified and elegant, decorated with seashells, mythological figures, and sometimes had imitations of the calcified walls of grottos, imitating natural springs.

In the middle of the 18th century Voltaire and other critics began to demand more open squares and more ornamental fountains. In Les Embellisements de Paris, written in 1749, Voltaire wrote, "We have only two fountains in good taste, and they should certainly be better placed. All the others are worthy of a village." The government responded to these demands for grander fountains by commissioning the Fontaine des Quatre-Saisons (1739) and by an even grander project for a square with fountains, Place Louis XV, which became the Place de la Concorde.

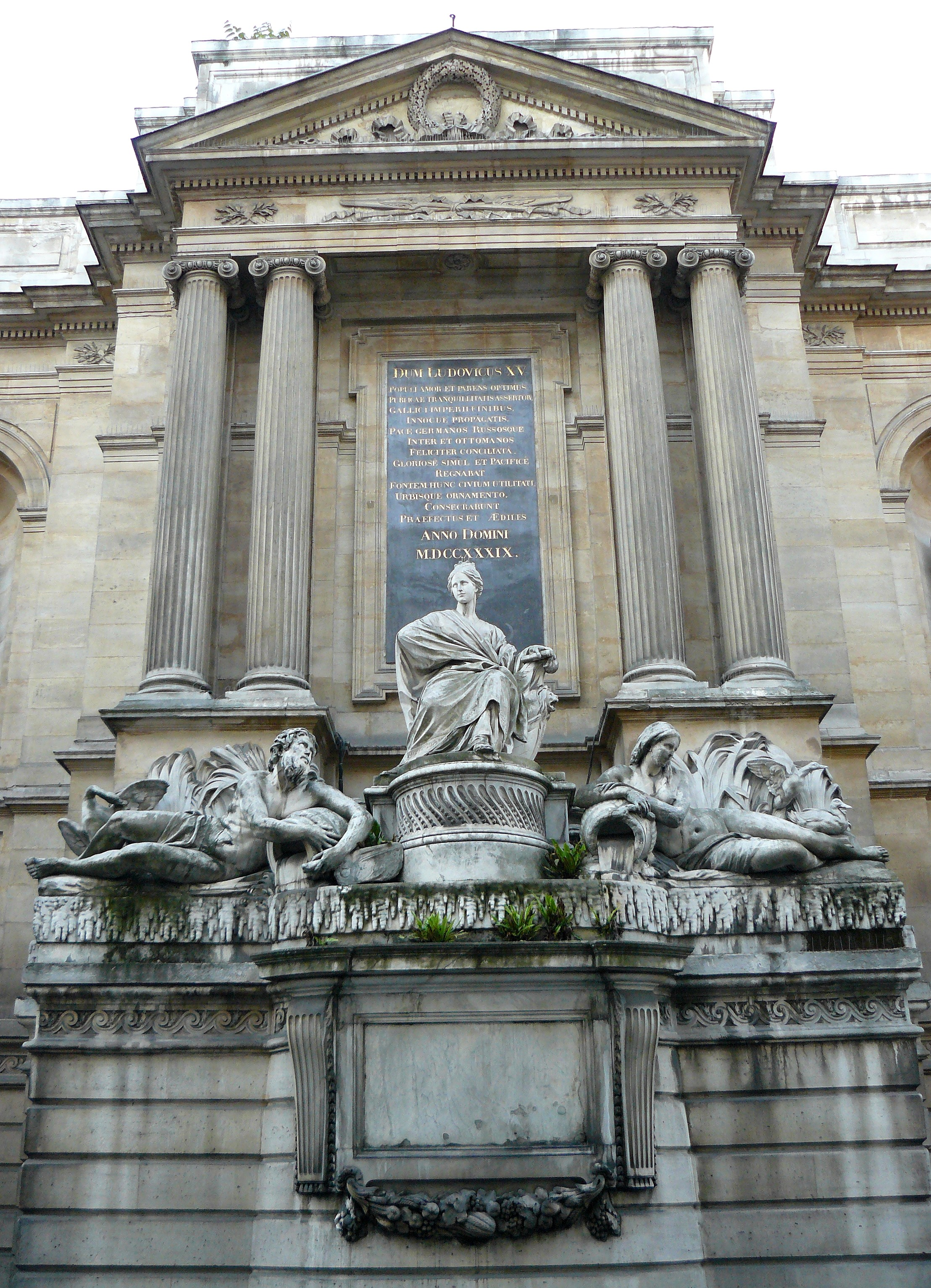
The massive Fontaine des Quatre-Saisons on the rue de Grenelle (7th arr.) (1739), by sculptor Edme Bouchardon, had a crowd of monumental statues but only two faucets, and irritated the philosopher Voltaire because of its large scale on the narrow street.

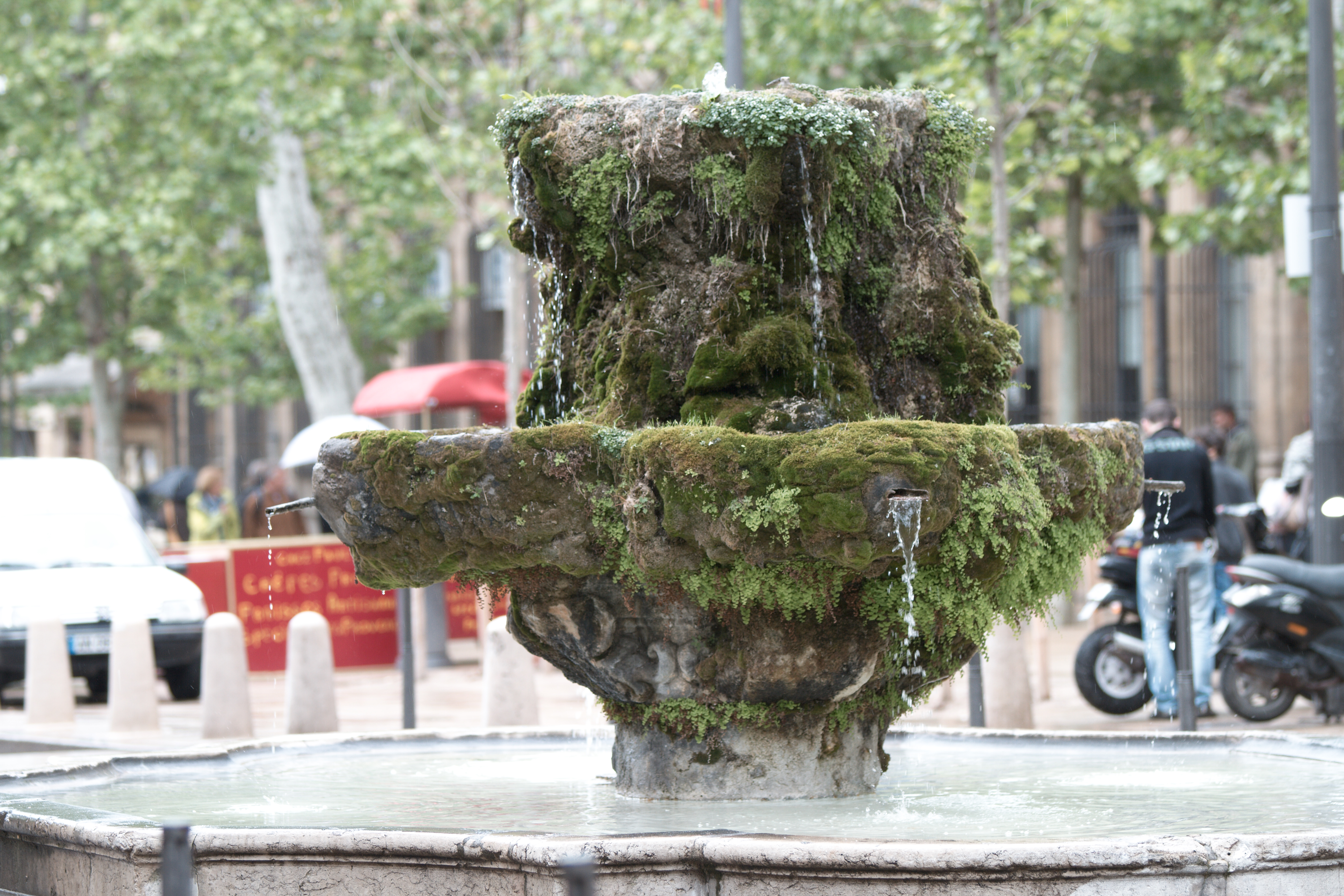
The Fontaine des Neuf-Canons, one of the two moss fountains in the Cours Mirabeau in Aix-en-Provence (18th century).

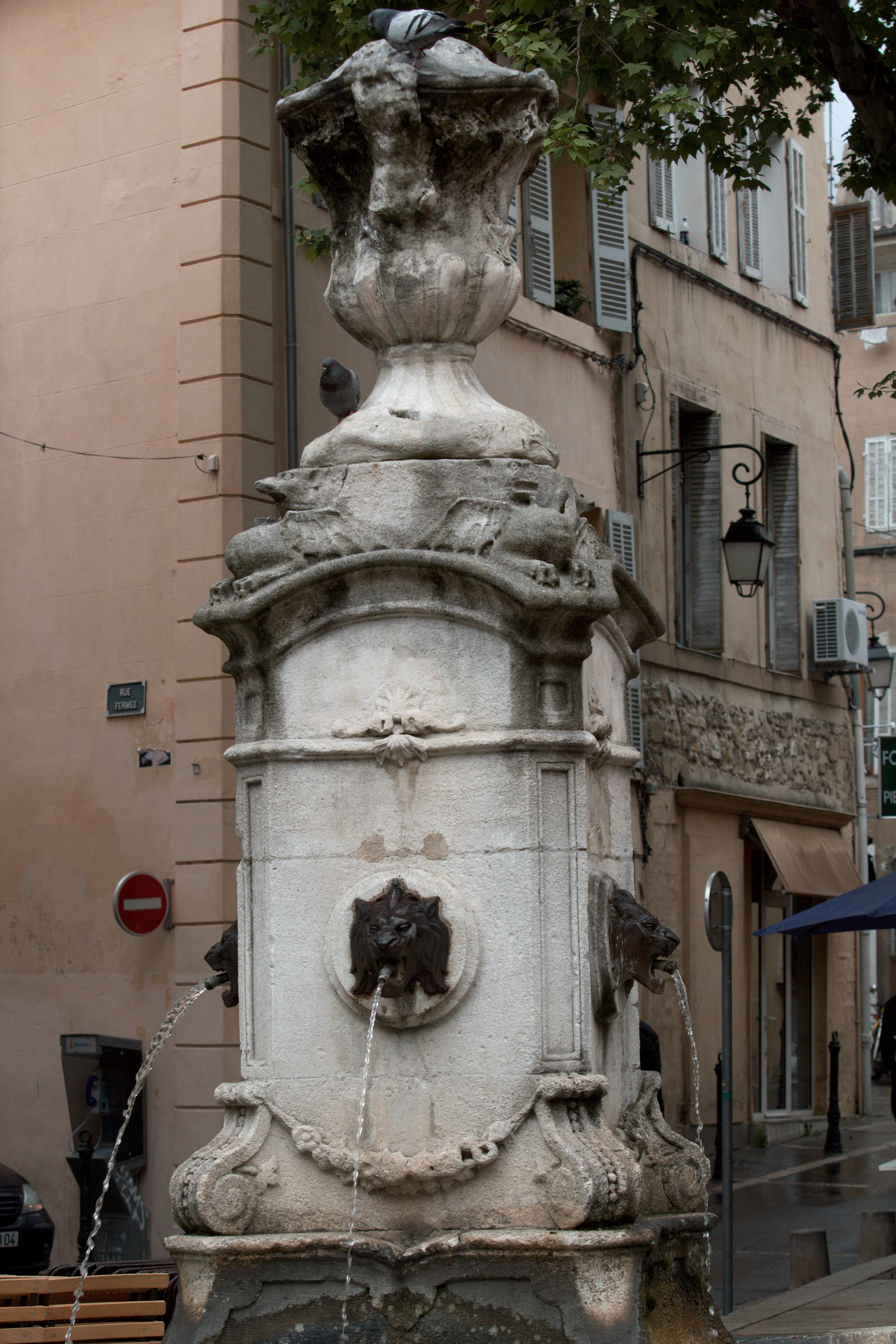
Fontaine de la place des Tanneurs, Aix-en -Provence. (1761). By the sculptor Chastel. It was rebuilt in 1861. The urn on top is from the original version.

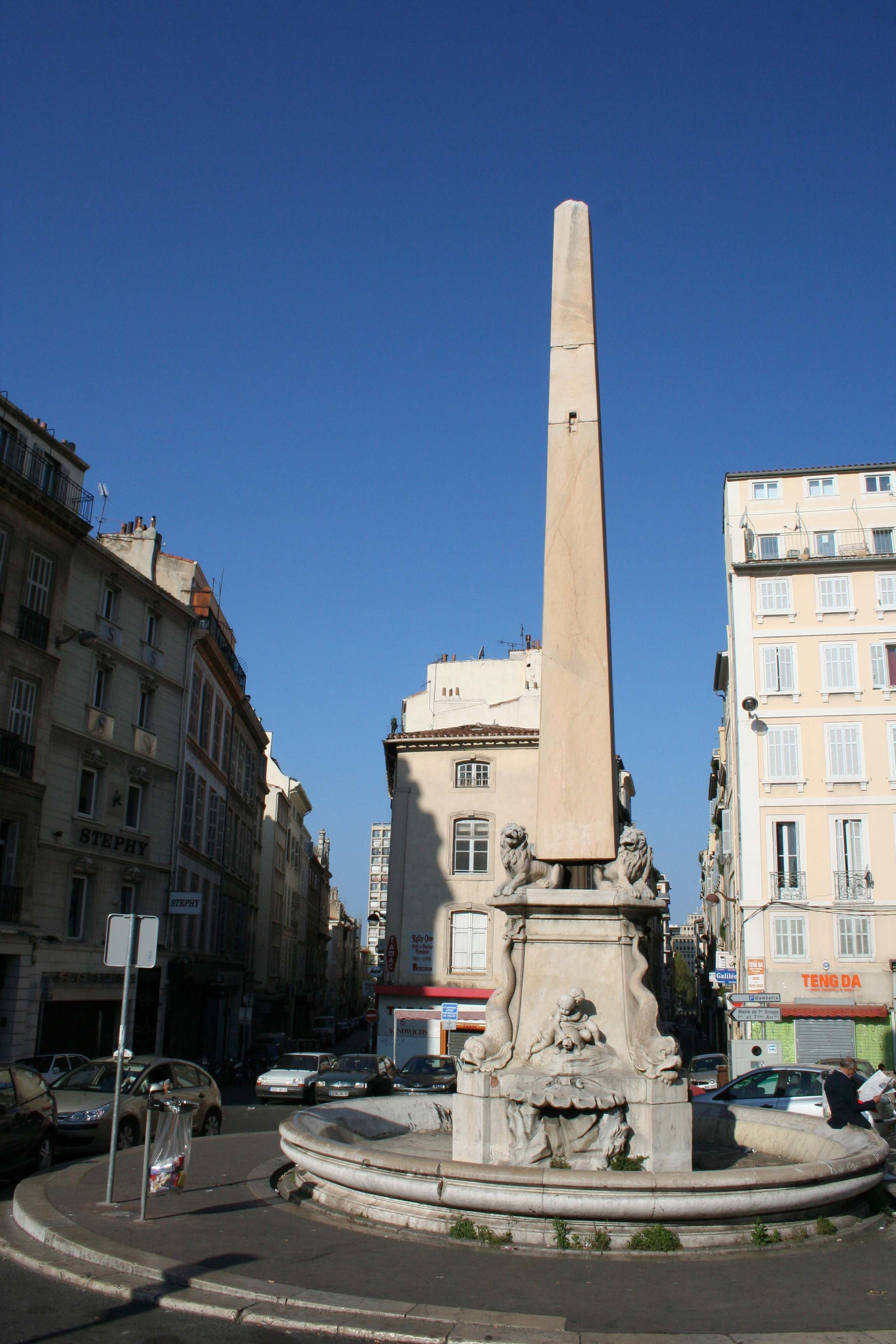
The Fontaine Fossati, in Place des Capucines, Marseille, features an obelisk and four dolphins. (1778).

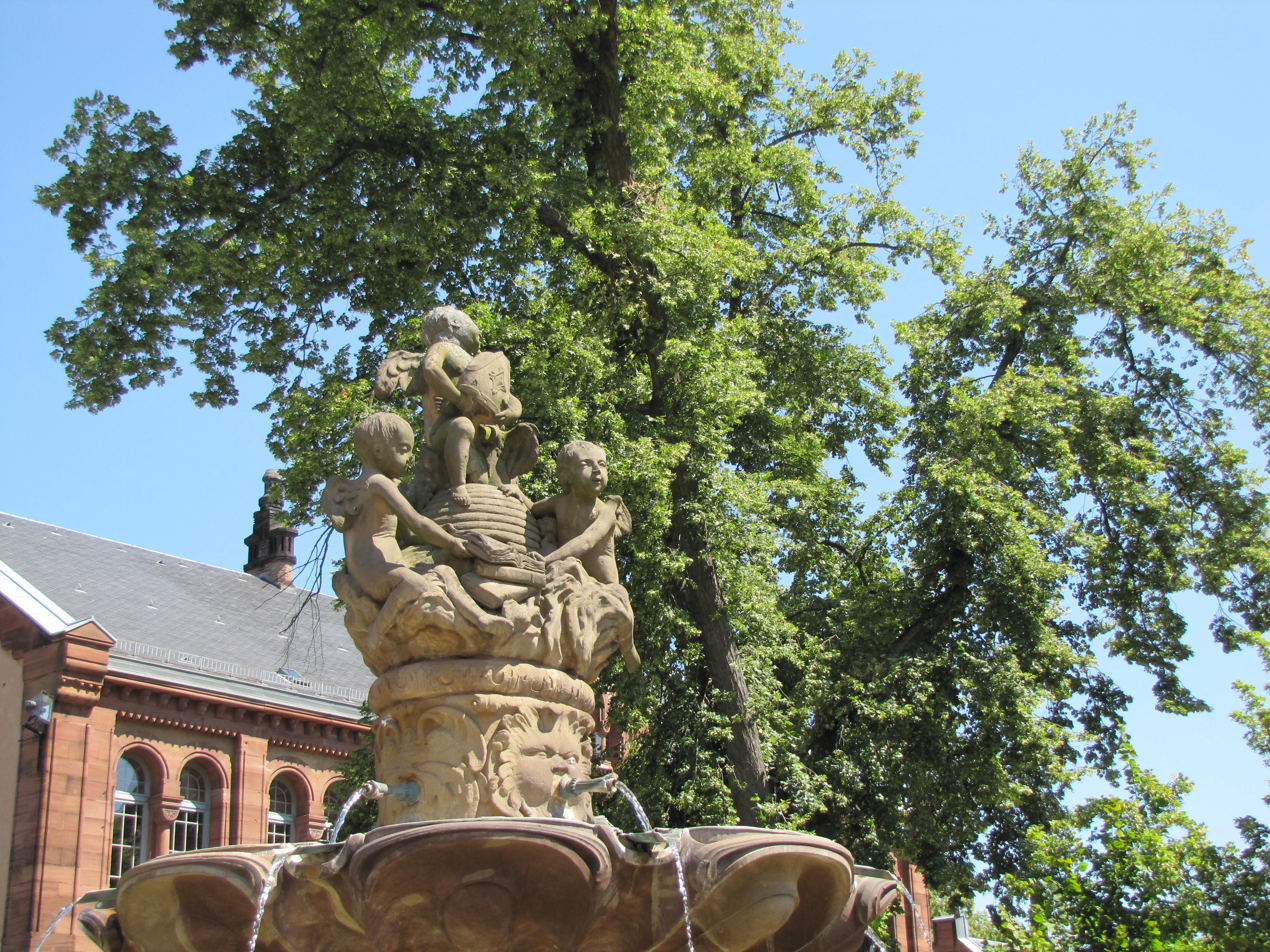
Fontaine aux Abeilles (Fountain of the Bees) in Haguenau, Alsace (18th century.) The fountain was originally in the Cistercian convent of Neubourg at Dauendorf.

== 19th Century ==
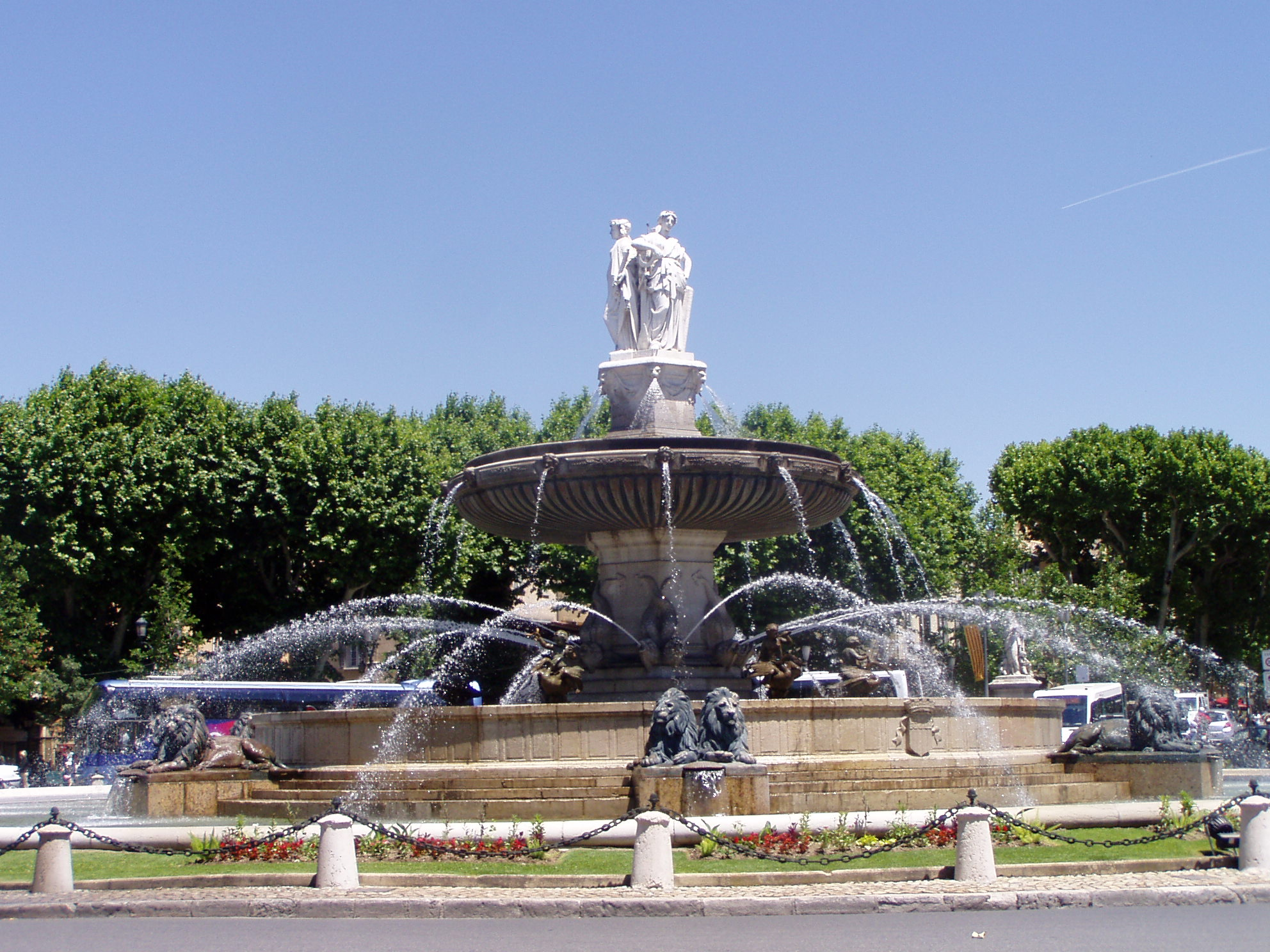
Fontaine de la Rotonde, in Aix-en-Provence (1862)

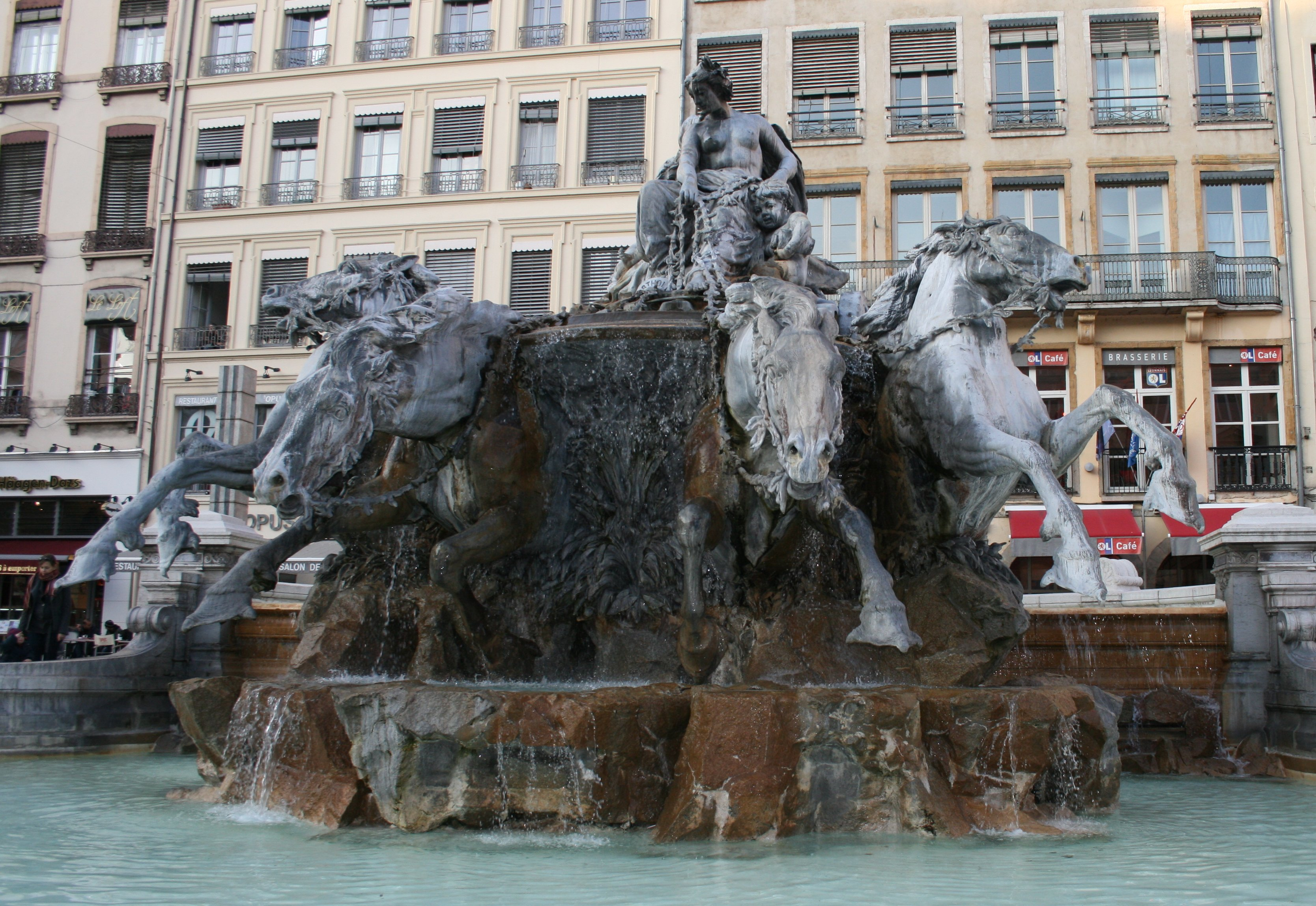
The Fontaine Bartholdi in Lyon (1892) was created by the sculptor of the Statue of Liberty.

The 19th century was the golden age of the French fountain. At the beginning the century, Napoleon Bonaparte began the construction of a new canal to Paris to supply water for drinking and for fountains, restored dozens of earlier fountains, including the Medici Fountain, and constructed fifteen new fountains, including the Fontaine du Palmier in Place du Chatelet. King Louis-Philippe (1830–1848) built more monumental fountains, including the Fontaines de la Concorde (1836–1840) on the Place de la Concorde. The Emperor Louis Napoleon (1851–1870) rebuilt many older fountains, including the Medici Fountain, and built new ones, including the Fontaine Saint-Michel (1860).

Outside of Paris, the major cities of France competed to build the most majestic monumental fountains.

In 1862, the city of Aix-en-Provence built the Fontaine de la Rotonde at the crossroads of the major roads coming into the city. It was built on the site of an earlier fountain, from 1697. The central element is a bronze vasque eight meters in diameter. Water flows from the vasque through bronze masquerons down into a stone basin ornamented with bronze children riding on swans. Sculpted dolphins on the base of the vasque shoot outwards to a lower basin, 32 meters in diameter, decorated with twelve bronze lions, and at the top, on a pedestal in the center of the vasque, are three statues of women representing agriculture, justice, and the arts.

In Marseille, the Palais Longchamp was constructed to mark the end of a new aqueduct which brought clean water from the Durance River to Marseille, ending a long water shortage; the fountain, opened in 1869, was the work of Henri Espérandieu, the architect of the major church of Marseille, Notre-Dame-de-la-Garde. The basins of the fountain were placed in the center of a double colonnade, which also housed the city's art museum and museum of natural history. The fountain was an allegorical group of sculptures, representing the Durance bringing well-being the Vine and Wheat, symbols of abundance.

The end of the 19th century saw a competition between the major cities of France to construct the most elaborate monumental fountains, composed of groups of allegorical figures.

The City of Toulon built a monumental fountain, the Fontaine de la Fédération, in 1890, to commemorate (a year late) the centennial of the French Revolution. It was the work of two brothers from Toulon, Stanislas Gaudensi Allar, the architect, and André-Joseph Allar, the sculptor. The fountain represents the person of France, in a boat, holding the torch of civilization in one hand, and the table of the Rights of Man and of the Citizen in her other and. At her feet are two figures representing Force and Justice. The boat seems to be riding on a cascade of water from which rise two spouts of water.

In 1890 the family of a wealthy Marseille merchant, Estrangin, donated another monumental fountain, the Fontaine Estrangin, a group of allegorical statues depicting Marseille seated upon a throne atop the prows of four ships, representing four continents, made by the Toulon sculptor André Allar.

The city of Nice built monumental fountain in 1891 to honor its native son, Garibaldi, the hero of Italian independence, who was born in Nice in 1807. The fountain features Garibaldi himself, and bronze figures of France and Italy.

The city of Bordeaux originally commissioned a monumental fountain for the 100th anniversary of the French Revolution from Frédéric Auguste Bartholdi, the sculptor who had made the State of Liberty. The statue was finished in 1889, and displayed at the Exposition Internationale in Paris in that year. Bordeaux decided in the end not to fund it, and the fountain instead was placed in Place des terreaux in Lyon in September 1892. The Fontaine Bartholdi shows France as a woman driving a chariot drawn by four horses, representing the four great rivers of France.

The improved technology of cast iron allowed mass production of fountains for the first time – the most famous example was the Wallace fountain, which appeared first in Paris, then in other cities around France. In 1872 a British millionaire, temperance advocate and philanthropist, Sir Richard Wallace, who had spent much of his youth in Paris and had lived there during the 1870 war, recognizing the difficulty and cost of finding drinking water in Paris after the 1870 war, and following a program he had already begun in London, donated fifty cast-iron drinking fountains to the city of Paris. The sculptor of the fountains was Charles-Auguste Lebourg, a student of François Rude. He designed two models, one free-standing and the other to be attached to a wall, and in 1881, added a third, simpler version. The fountains were a popular success, and new ones were still being installed until the beginning of the First World War.

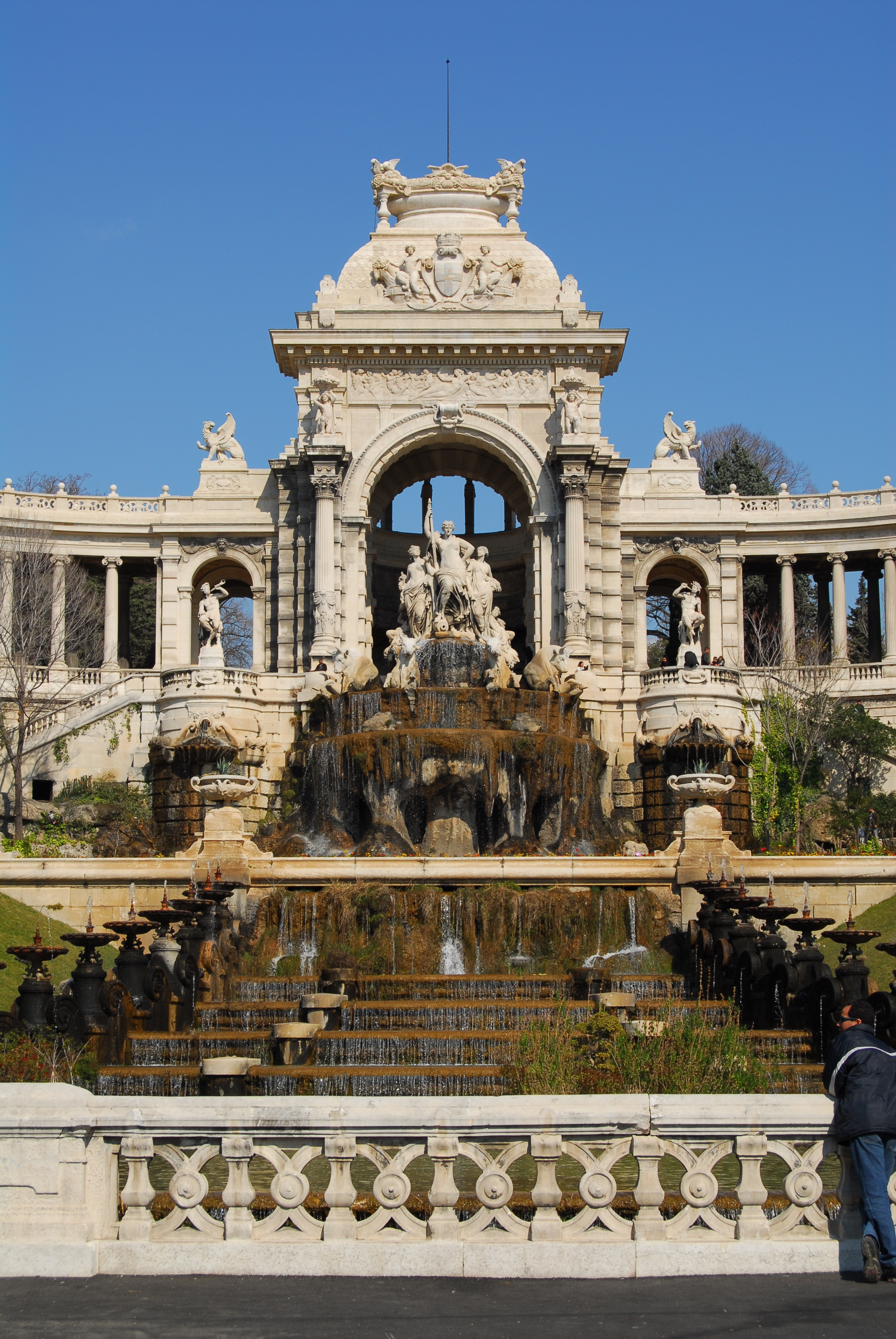
Palais Longchamp in Marseille (1869 marked the terminus of the new aqueduct which brought water from the Durance River to Marseille)

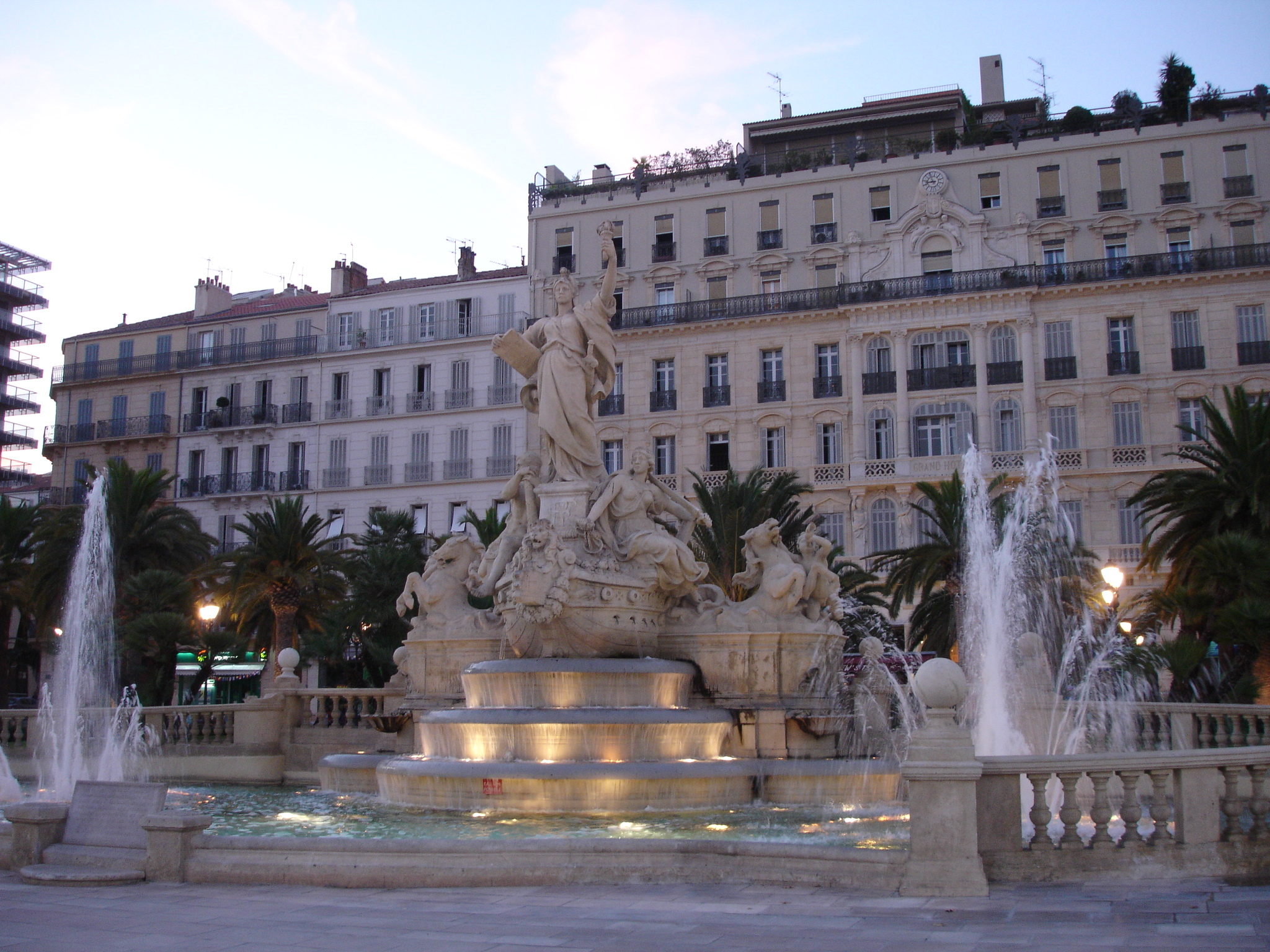
Fontaine de la Federation in the Place de la liberte, Toulon (1890)

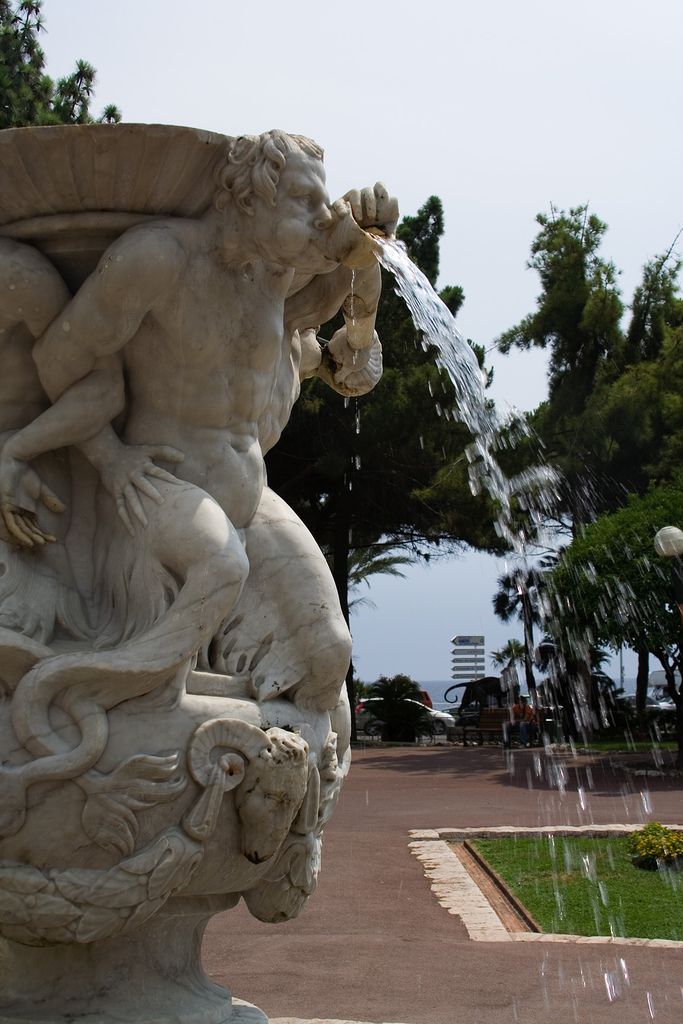
Fontaine des Tritons, in the Jardins Albert I in Nice, (1827).

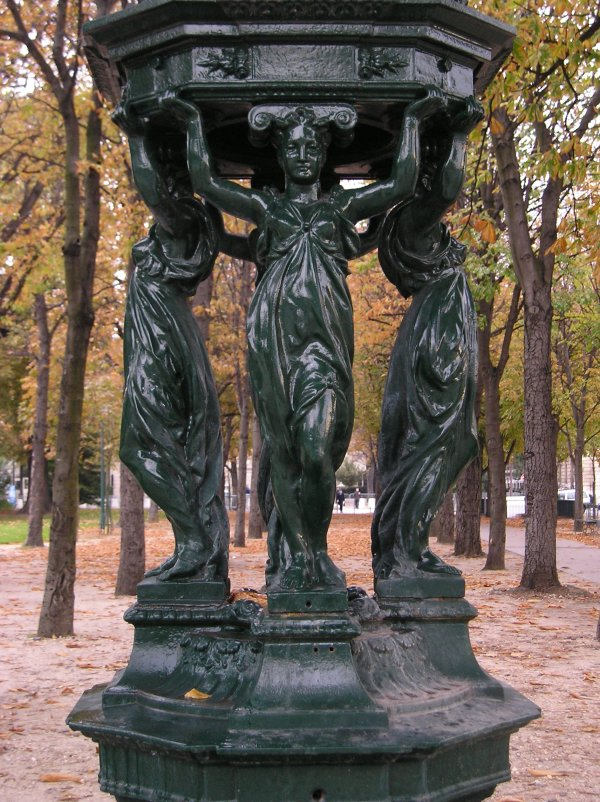
A cast-iron Wallace fountain, one of dozens installed in French cities by millionaire Sir Richard Wallace to provide an alternative to liquor for the working classes

== Twentieth century ==
Relatively few new fountains were built in France in the 20th century. Fountains were no longer needed to supply drinking water, and two World Wars interrupted the creation of purely decorative architecture.

The fountains of the first half of the century were largely in the classical styles of the previous century. In the second half of the century, fountain designs became as diverse as the styles of modern art, using new materials and new technologies.

From 1911 to 1913 the city of Marseille built an exceptional monumental fountain, the Fontaine Contini, donated by the stone merchant Jules Cantini, made by the Toulon sculptor Andre Allar. It was made entirely of white Carrara marble, and was in the form of a group of allegoritical statues, surrounding a column thirty meters high. At the top of the column was an allegorical statue of Marseille, holding a ship in her hand, and passionate figures around the base representing the Rhone River, the Mediterranean, the Torrent and the Spring.

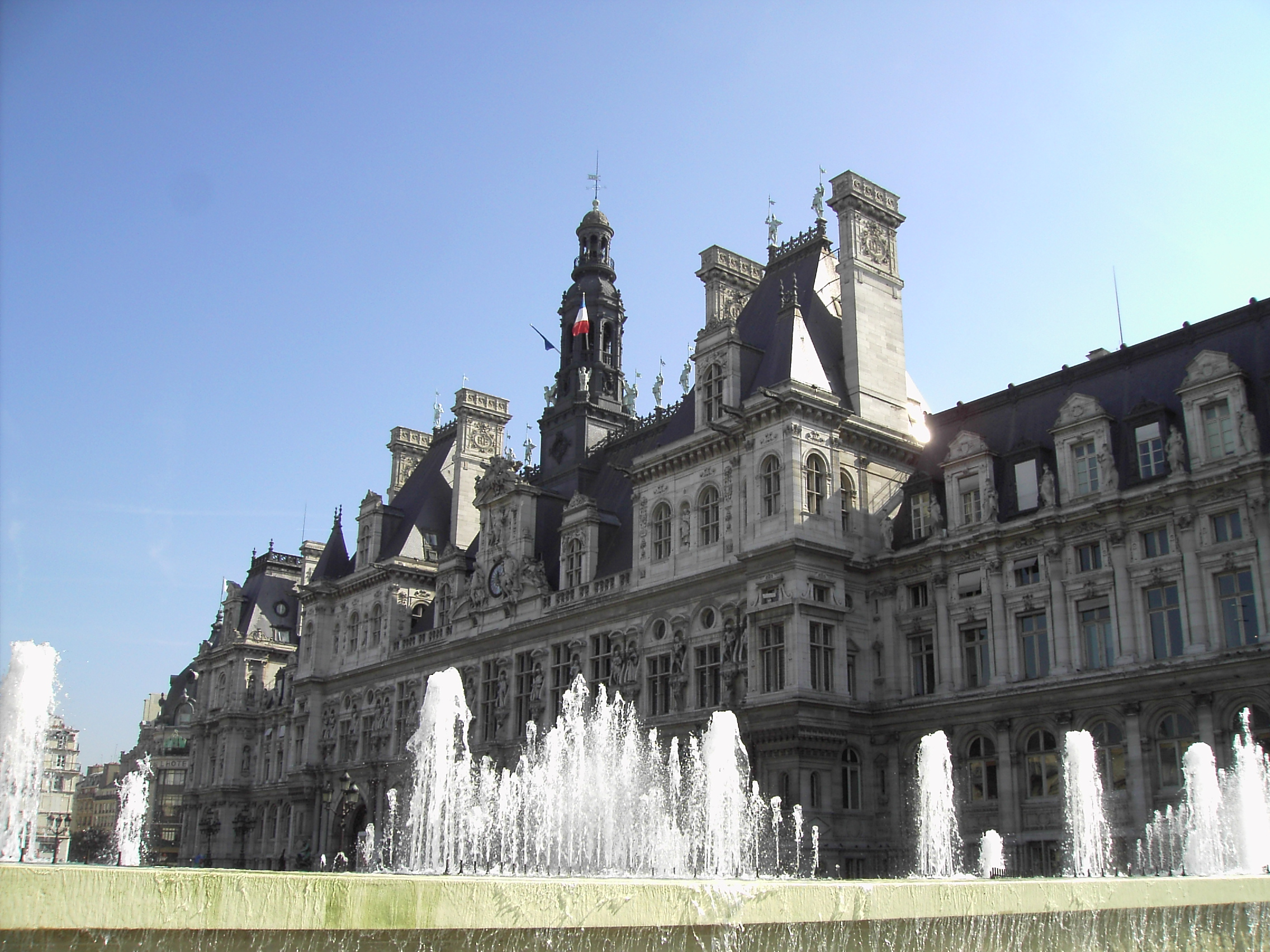
The Fontaine de l'Hôtel de Ville, Place de l'Hôtel de Ville, (1983), François-Xavier Lalanne, sculptor.

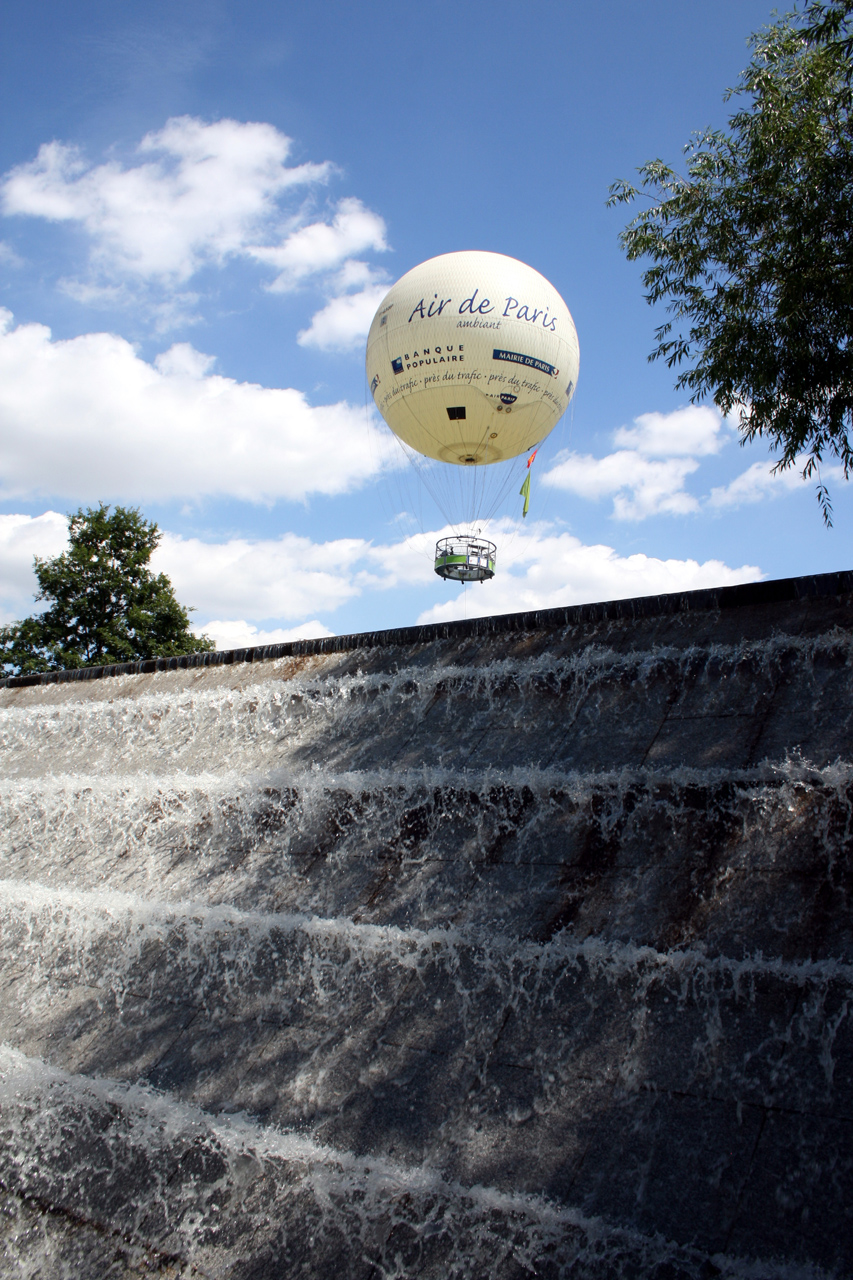
Cascade, Parc André Citroën, (1992)

Only a handful of fountains were built in Paris between 1940 and 1980. The most important ones built during that period were on the edges of the city, on the west, just outside the city limits, at La Défense, and to the east at the Bois de Vincennes.

Between 1981 and 1995, during the terms of President François Mitterrand and Culture Minister Jack Lang, and of Mitterrand's bitter political rival, Paris Mayor Jacques Chirac (Mayor from 1977 until 1995), the city experienced a program of monumental fountain building that exceeded that of Napoleon Bonaparte or Louis Philippe. More than one hundred fountains were built in Paris in the 1980s and 1990s, mostly in the neighborhoods outside the center of Paris, where there had been few fountains before. The Stravinsky Fountain, the Fountain of the Pyramid of the Louvre, the Buren Fountain and Les Sphérades fountain in the Palais Royale, the Fontaine du Parc Andre Citroën, and new fountains at Les Halles, the Jardin de Reuilly, and beside the Gare Maine-Montparnasse were all built under President Mitterrand and Mayor Chirac.

The Mitterrand-Chirac fountains had no single style or theme. Many of the fountains were designed by famous sculptors or architects, such as Jean Tinguely, I.M. Pei, Claes Oldenburg and Daniel Buren, who had radically different ideas of what a fountain should be. Some of them, like the Pyramide de Louvre fountain, had glistening sheets of water; while in the Buren Fountain in the Palais Royale, the water was invisible, hidden under the pavement of the fountain. Some of the new fountains were designed with the help of noted landscape architects and used natural materials, such as the fountain in the Parc Floral in the Bois de Vincennes by landscape architect Daniel Collin and sculptor François Stahly. Some were solemn, and others were whimsical. Most made little effort to blend with their surroundings - they were designed to attract attention.

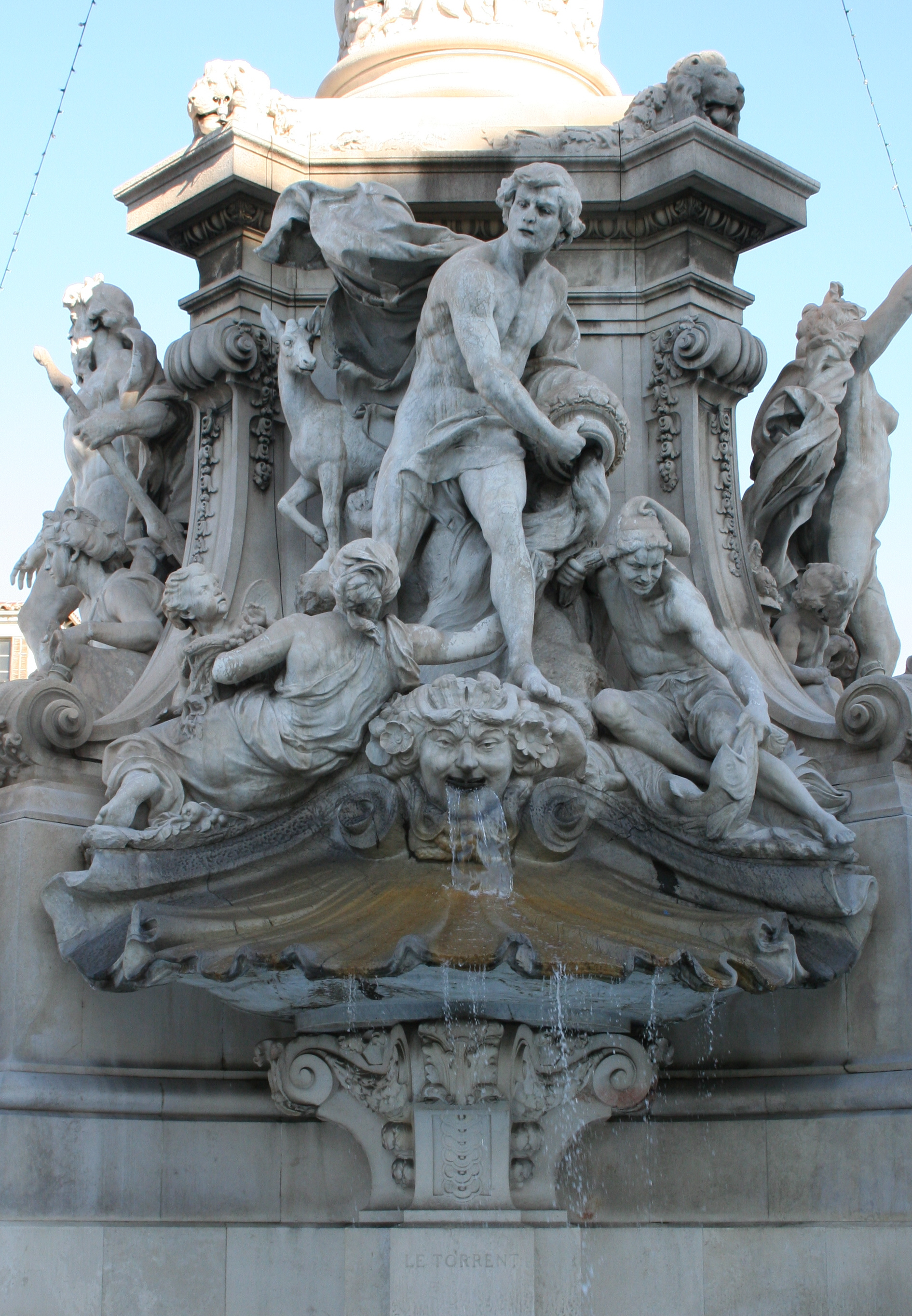
Fontaine Cantini, Marseille, detail of 'The Torrent" (1911)

== Contemporary French fountains ==
Contemporary French fountains use a wide variety of new materials (plastic, stainless steel, glass) and are often designed to make a statement. Water is always present (otherwise they wouldn't be fountains) but sometimes it plays a minor or supporting role to the sculptural element.

Few new fountains have been built in Paris since 2000. The most notable is La Danse de la fontaine emergente, located on Place Augusta-Holmes, rue Paul Klee, in the 13th arrondissement. It was designed by the French-Chinese sculptor Chen Zhen, shortly before his death in 2000, and finished by his widow and collaborator Xu Min in 2008. It shows a dragon, in stainless steel, glass and plastic, emerging and submerging from the pavement of the square. Water under pressure flows through the transparent skin of the dragon.

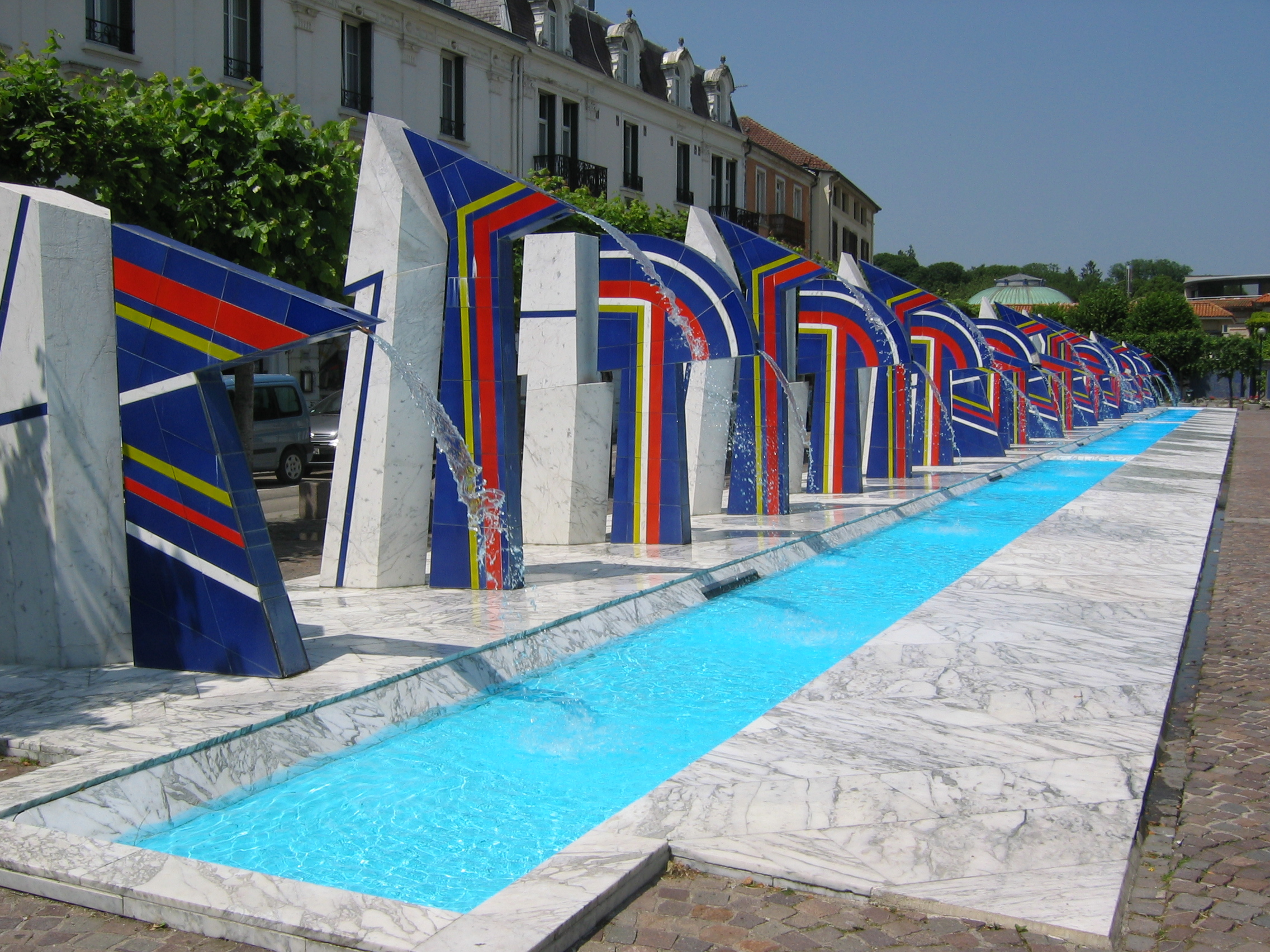
Place des fontaines in Contrexéville, Vosges, Lorraine

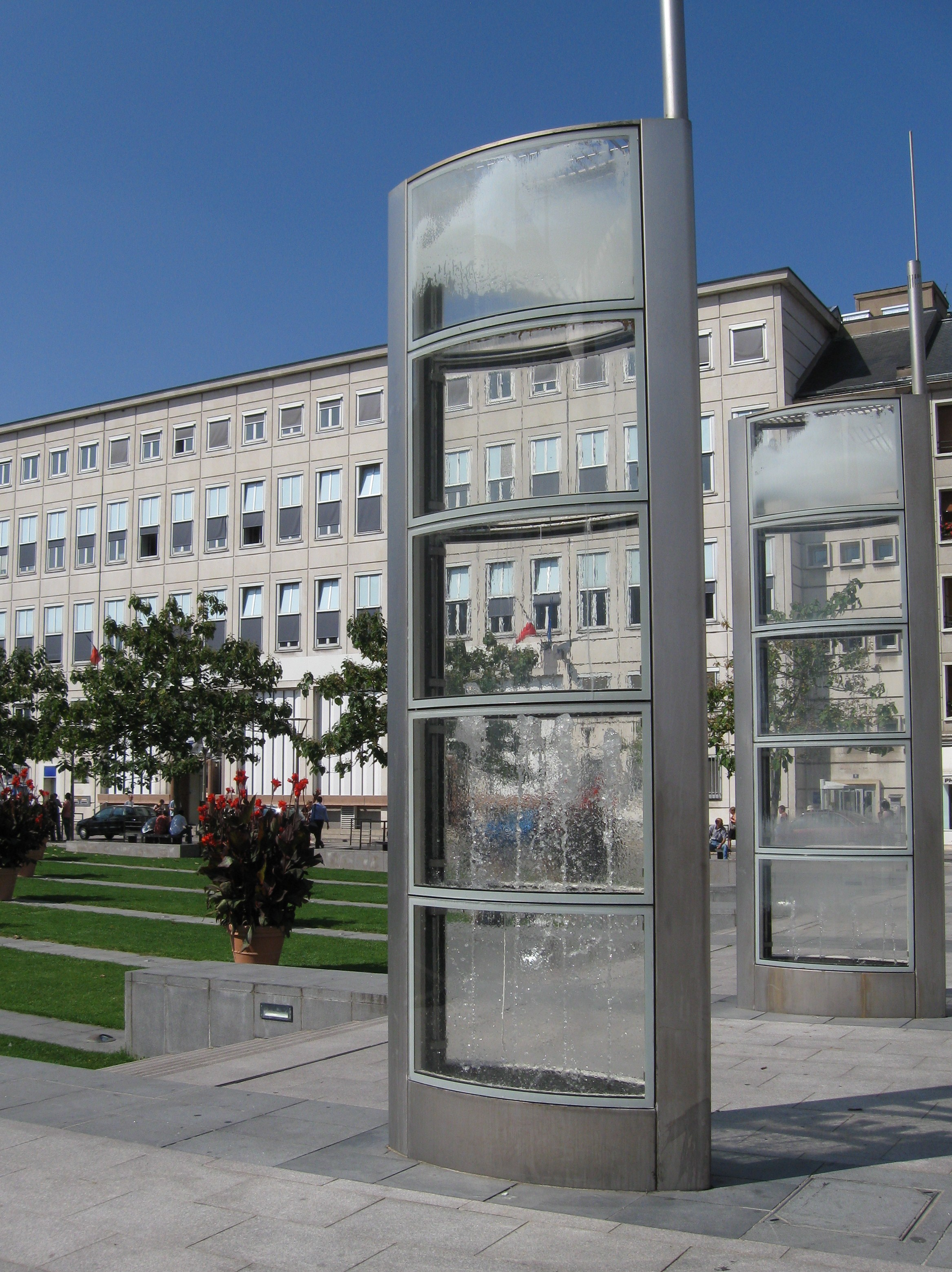
Fountain in Place Charles De Gaulle, Orléans

== See also ==
- Fountains in Paris
- List of Paris fountains
- Fountain

== Bibliography ==
- Marilyn Symmes (editor), Fountains-Splash and Spectacle- Water and Design from the Renaissance to the Present. Thames and Hudson, in cooperation with the Cooper-Hewitt National Design Museum of the Smithsonian Institution. (1998).
- Louis Plantier, Fontaines de Provence et de Côte d'Azur, Edisud publishers, Les Editions de La Lesse, Aix-en-Provence, 2007. (ISBN 978-2-7449-0708-1)
- Paris et ses Fontaines, del la Renaissance a nos jours, edited by Beatrice de Andia, Dominique Massounie, Pauline Prevost-Marcilhacy and Daniel Rabreau, from the Collection Paris et son Patrimoine, Paris, 1995.
- Louis Plantier, Fontaines de Provence et de Côte deAzur, Édisud, Aix-en-Provence, 2007
- Frédérick Cope and Tazartes Maurizia, Les fontaines de Rome, Editions Citadelles et Mazenod, 2004
- André Jean Tardy, Fontaines Toulonnaises, Les Editions de la Nerthe, 2001. ISBN 2-913483-24-0
- Hortense Lyon, La Fontaine Stravinsky, Collection Baccalaureat arts plastiques 2004, Centre national de documentation pedagogique
- Congès, Anne Roth (2000), Glanum- De l"oppidum salyen à la cité latine, Paris: Editions du Patrimoine, Centre des Monuments Nationaux, (ISBN 978-2-7577-0079-2)
- Hedin, Thomas F. (2022), The Fountain of Latona: Louis XIV, Charles Le Brun, and the Gardens of Versailles, University of Pennsylvania Press. ISBN 978-0-8122-5375-7
