= Laporte =

Laporte, LaPorte, or La Porte (lit. 'The Door') may refer to:

== Places ==
=== Canada ===
- Laporte, Saskatchewan, a hamlet
- Laporte (electoral district), a provincial electoral district in Quebec

=== Haiti ===
- La Porte, Les Cayes, Haiti, a village in the Les Cayes commune of Haiti

=== United States ===
- La Porte, California
- Laporte, Colorado, part of the greater Fort Collins area
- La Porte, Indiana, in Northwest Indiana
  - LaPorte County, Indiana
  - LaPorte High School (Indiana)
  - LaPorte Community School Corporation
  - La Porte Civic Auditorium
  - La Porte Municipal Airport
- La Porte City, Iowa
- Laporte, Michigan
- Laporte, Minnesota
- Laporte, Pennsylvania
- Laporte Township, Sullivan County, Pennsylvania
- La Porte, Texas, part of the greater Houston area
  - La Porte Municipal Airport (Texas)
  - La Porte High School (Texas)
  - La Porte Independent School District

== People ==
- André Laporte (born 1931), Belgian composer
- Arnaud II de La Porte (1737–1792), French government minister
- Aymeric Laporte (born 1994), French-born Spanish footballer
- Bernard Laporte (born 1964), French rugby union coach and politician
- Christophe Laporte (born 1992), French cyclist
- Éric Laporte (born 1976), Canadian politician
- Eric Laporte (tenor), Canadian opera singer
- François-Louis Laporte, comte de Castelnau (1802–1880), French naturalist
- Frank LaPorte (1880–1930), American athlete
- Frankie LaPorte (1901–1972), American mobster
- Helen Reed de Laporte (1864–1936), American educator and politician
- Juan Laporte (born 1959), Puerto Rican boxer
- Leo Laporte (born 1956), radio and television host
- Leon J. LaPorte (born 1946), United States Army general
- Otto Laporte (1902-1971), German-born American physicist
  - Laporte rule, a selection rule in spectroscopy, named after Otto Laporte
- Pierre Laporte (1921–1970), Canadian politician, assassinated in 1970.
- Pierre Frank Laporte, Seychellois economist and politician
- Stéphane Laporte (born 1966), French javelin thrower
- Steve La Porte, American make-up artist

== Businesses ==
- Laporte plc, a British chemicals business
- LaPorte CPAs and Business Advisors

== Science ==
- Laporte rule, a spectroscopic selection rule

== See also ==
- De La Porte
- Delaporte
- Laporta (disambiguation)
- Osvaldo Laport, Uruguayan-Argentine actor
