= Saint-Jean-Baptiste Church =

Saint-Jean-Baptiste Church, Église Saint-Jean-Baptiste, or variants thereof, may refer to:

== Canada ==
- Saint-Jean-Baptiste Church (Montreal), Montreal
- Saint-Jean-Baptiste Church (Quebec City), Quebec City

== France ==
- Église Saint-Jean-Baptiste du Faubourg in Aix-en-Provence
- Église Saint-Jean-Baptiste de Bastia in Bastia, Corsica
- Église Saint-Jean-Baptiste de La Porta in La Porta, Corsica
- Église Saint-Jean-Baptiste, Paris

== United States ==
- St. Jean Baptiste Roman Catholic Church, Upper East Side of Manhattan, New York City
