= De La Porte =

De La Porte is a surname. Notable people with the surname include:

- Arnaud I de La Porte (c. 1706–1770)
- Arnaud II de La Porte (1737–1792)
- Joseph de La Porte (1714–1779), French priest, literary critic, poet and playwright
- Elizabeth de la Porte (1941–2020), South African harpsichordist
- Charles de La Porte (1602–1664), French nobleman and general
- Regnaud de La Porte (died 1325), French bishop and cardinal

== See also ==
- Delaporte
- Laporte (disambiguation)
