= Brufal =

Brufal is a surname. Notable people with the surname include:

- Antonio Ximénez Brufal (1751–1826), Spanish composer
- Joaquín Nicolás Ximénez Brufal (1742–1791?), Spanish composer
