= Fontaine des Neuf-Canons =

Coordinates: 43°31′36″N 5°26′55″E

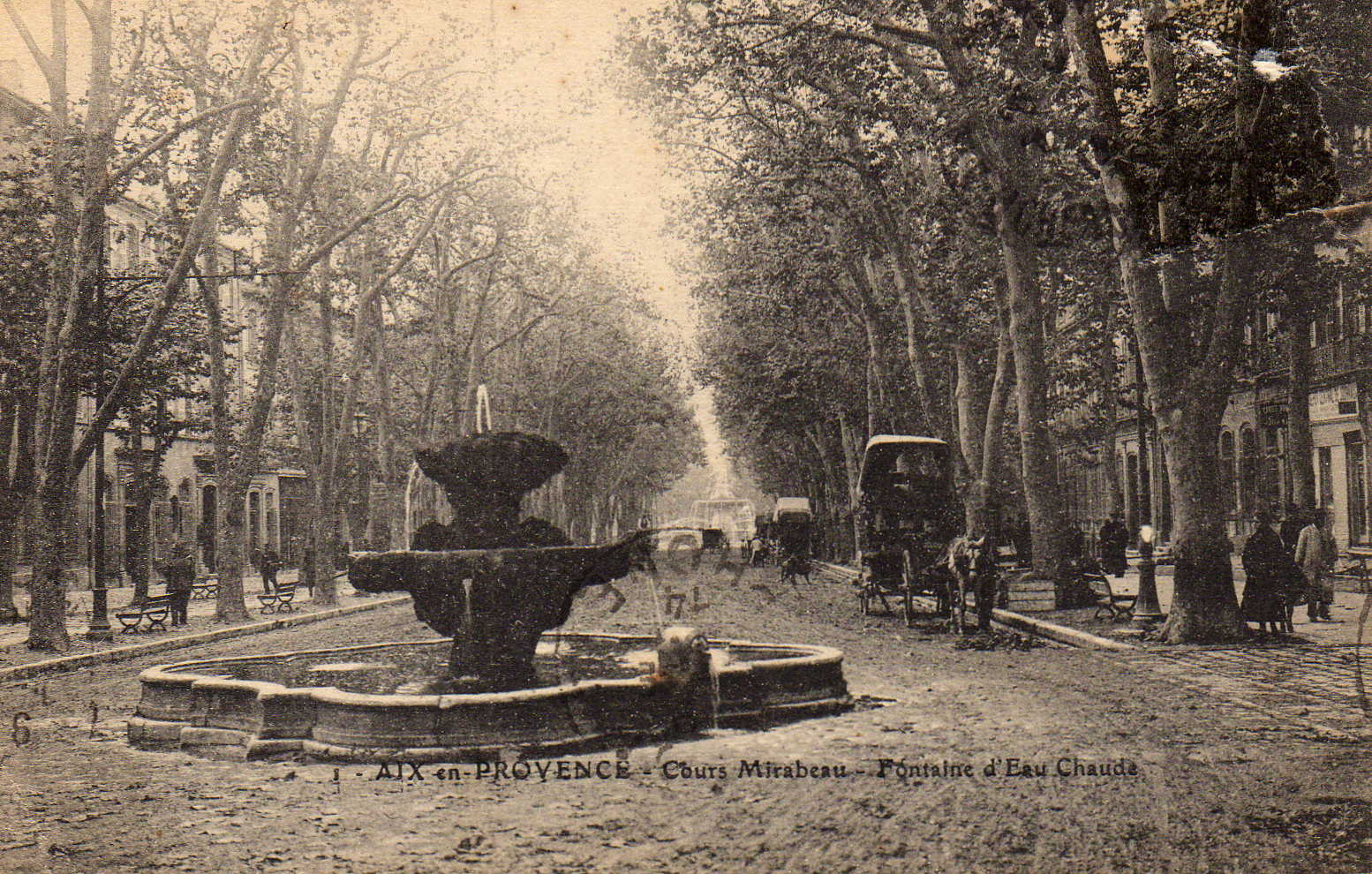
Fontaine des Neuf-Canons in 1914.

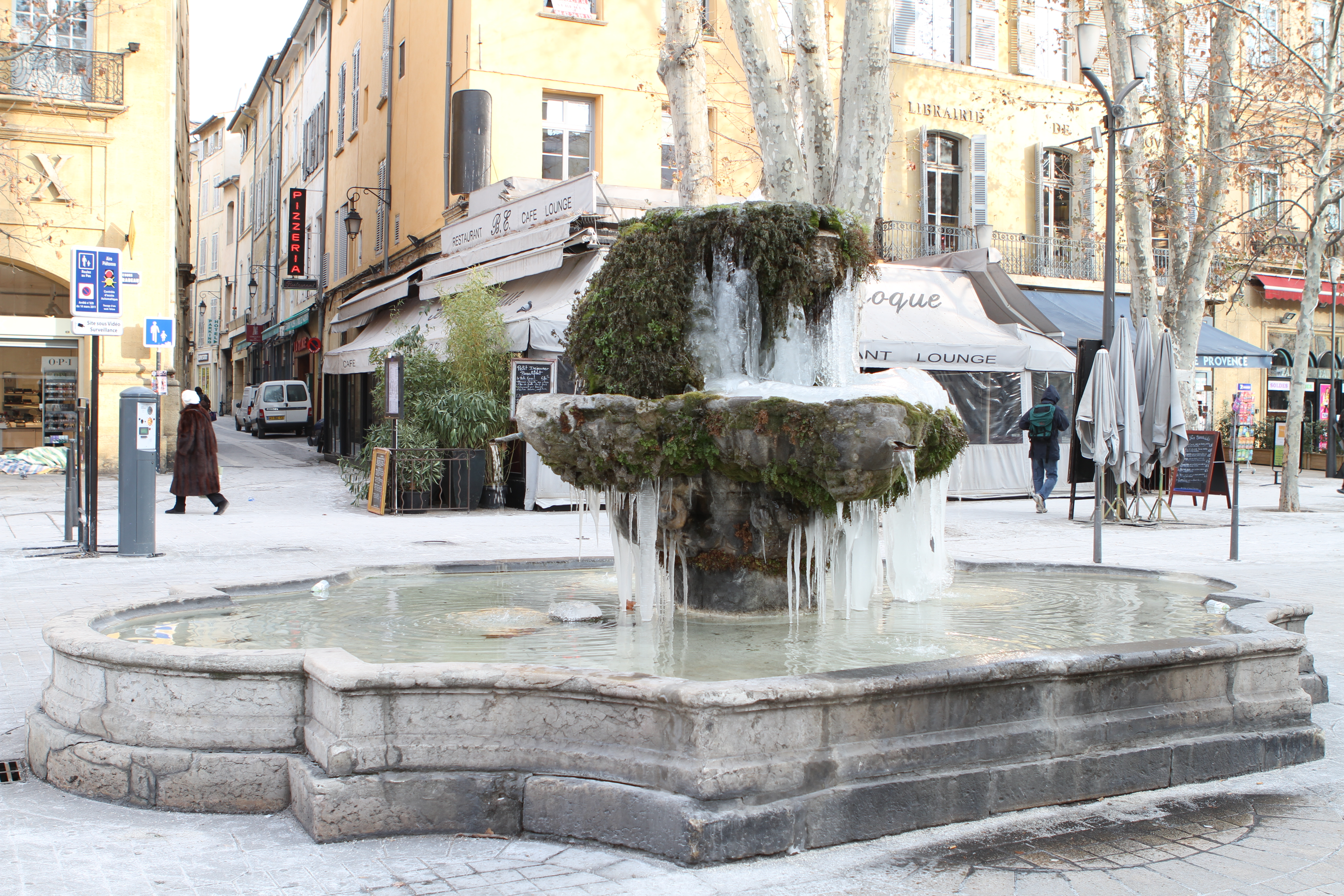
Fontaine des Neuf-Canons in winter 2012.

The Fontaine des Neuf-Canons is a listed fountain in Aix-en-Provence, Bouches-du-Rhône, France.

== Location ==
The fountain is located on the Cours Mirabeau in the center of Aix-en-Provence, France.

== History ==
Prior to the construction of this fountain, a watering hole was used here by shepherds and farmers for their livestock. In 1691, architect Laurent Vallon (1652-1724) designed this fountain. It is covered in moss.

== Heritage significance ==
It has been listed as a "monument historique" since 15 January 1929.
