= Laporta =

Laporta or LaPorta or La Porta is a place name or surname, and may refer to:

- La Porta, French commune on the island of Corsica
- Alphonse F. La Porta (born 1939), former US Ambassador to Mongolia
- Elizza La Porta (1902-1997), Romanian born film actress
- Francesco Laporta (born 1990), Italian professional golfer
- Frans Laporta (1907–2002), Belgian architect
- Horace François Bastien Sébastiani de La Porta (1771-1851), French general and politician
- Isidro de Laporta (1750-1808), Spanish composer and guitarist
- Joe LaPorta (born 1980), American engineer
- Joan Laporta (born 1962), Catalan politician and current president of FC Barcelona
- John LaPorta (1920-2004), American jazz clarinettist
- Matt LaPorta (born 1985), American former baseball player
- Norberto La Porta (1938-2007), Argentine politician
- Phil LaPorta (born 1952), former American footballer
- Sam LaPorta (born 2001), American football player
- Tina La Porta, American digital artist

== See also ==
- Laporte (disambiguation)
