= Eric Laporte =

Eric Laporte may refer to:

- Éric Laporte, Quebec politician
- Eric Laporte (tenor)
