= Joseph Pellerin =

French numismatist

Joseph Pellerin (1684–1783) was a French Intendant-General of the Navy, first Commissioner of the Navy as well as a celebrated numismatic pioneer.

Pellerin was born at Marly, near Versailles 27 April 1684 and died 2 August 1783 at his château of Plainville in Picardy.

== Youth and career ==
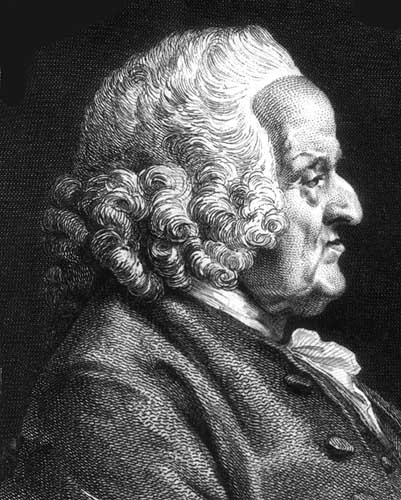
Pellerin at 98 years of age

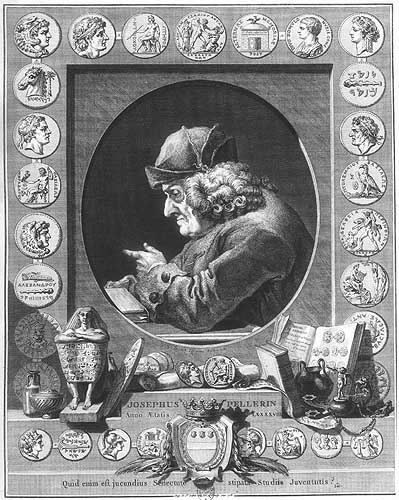
Pellerin surrounded by some of his coins

In his youth his principal studies were in the modern and classical languages, which included French, English, Spanish, Italian, Arabic, Latin, Greek, Hebrew and Syriac as well as others, and it was to his precocious expertise in these that he owed his admission to the offices of the Ministry of the Marine (as the Navy was called in France) in 1706, where he became employed in correspondence. Having in 1709 succeeded (despite the previous failure of trained cryptographers) to decipher some coded letters seized from a Spanish frigate concerning the Archduke Charles of Austria (one of the pretenders to the Spanish throne, the other being Louis XIV's nephew the Duke of Anjou; this being the cause of the ongoing Wars of the Spanish Succession), by this astonishing feat he caught the attention of then Naval Minister Pontchartrain who named him cabinet secretary.

He enjoyed similar favour in the succeeding ministries: under Louis XIV's legitimated son the Count of Toulouse he was named Commissioner of the Navy in 1718, and Maurepas elevated him to General Commissioner, and then First Commissioner. His detailed plans for the invasion of Britain to restore Prince Charles Edward Stuart to the throne (and thus occupy British forces which were greatly hampering French colonial affairs), though supported by Maurepas went unexecuted by Louis XV (whether out of disregard, pique against Maurepas, personally, or for another reason remains in debate). They may be consulted in the Maurepas Papers at Cornell University.

After a very successful career he sought an early retirement in 1745 citing health problems due to overwork. In fact he remained on as a greatly valued expert consultant for several years afterwards, his positions having gradually been formally assumed by his son Joseph Jr., who received letters-patent of nobility in recognition of two generations' of his family's service to the crown in 1740.

== Pioneer of numismatics ==
Pellerin Sr. thus eventually became free to follow his true passion, which was the study of ancient (principally Greek) coins. Tradition has it that he encouraged the sailors of the French Mediterranean Fleet to buy up such ancient coins as they found on offer throughout their range, which he guaranteed to buy back from them at double the purchase price. In this way he gradually accumulated what became the largest and most valuable collection of ancient Greek coins ever to be held in private hands to that date, amounting to 33,500 coins which he ultimately sold to Louis XVI in 1776 for £300,000 . This notable collection, housed in massive original marquetry and ormolu cases in the Louis XV style, still forms a nucleus of the collection of the Bibliothèque Nationale de France and may be viewed in the old buildings on the Rue de Richelieu in Paris to this day.

Pellerin's study brought many advances to the science of numismatics. Through the publication of his enormous ten-volume catalogue of ancient Greek coins (Paris: Chez H. L. Guerin & L. F. Delatour, 1762–1778, 10 vol. in-4º. pl), which were in fact a catalogue raisonné of his own immense collection, he brought clarity to the field by being the first to arrange the many thousands of issues geographically as well as chronologically. His identification of many puzzling pieces were a testimony to his powers of observation and perspicacity. He could be said to have cleared a path for the famous Eckhel. Such errors that slipped into his work were later caught by Khell, Barthélemy (who was to negotiate the purchase of the collection for the King), Swinton and the Abbé Leblond.

He grew progressively more blind from the time of his retirement from public service and was almost completely blind at the time of his death, a near-centenarian in 1782. He found, however, a way to turn this handicap to profit, working on the succeeding volumes of his opus by day as easily as by night, writing his text on a thin ribbon of paper that he pulled off one spool only to be wound back up onto another to be later transcribed by his secretary. His sense of touch became phenomenally acute and he was able to identify minor variants of certain coins by subtle tactile differences alone. The portrait displayed on the upper right side of this page, from the frontispiece to one of the volumes of his work shows him surrounded by some of his favourite coins and antiquities in 1780, when he was already over 98 years of age.

== Family and legacy ==
Pellerin married into another Versailles family in 1714 when he wed Marie-Anne, niece of Michel-Richard Delalande, court composer to Louis XIV and one of the great exponents of the French baroque motet, among his many other masterpieces. His daughter, also called Marie-Anne, married Arnaud I de La Porte (or De Laporte) in 1737 who later inherited the Pellerin offices after the premature death of Joseph Jr. The La Porte brothers were to prove very influential in the development of French colonial policy, particularly towards New France (Quebec), Arnaud's younger brother Jean-Baptiste de La Porte-Lalanne being named special envoy to Quebec to look into the civil administration and to check into some alleged financial irregularities there. He later went on to become Commissioner of the French Leeward Islands, and Saint Domingue (Haiti).

Pellerin's grandson, Arnaud II de La Porte, after a brief stint as Minister of the Navy in 1789 became intendant of the Civil List in 1790. A close confidant of the beleaguered king, Louis XVI entrusted him with great sums of private money to be distributed toward the moderation of the rapidly radicalising revolutionary fervour. Despite a close collaboration with Mirabeau, and especially due to the latter's premature death, La Porte's efforts proved to be in vain, and he was arrested and convicted of treason against the Revolution becoming, on 23 August 1793 the second political victim of the guillotine. In a macabre gesture, his severed head was then presented to the King, imprisoned in the Temple, as a grisly birthday gift. His services and ultimate sacrifice were recalled during the restoration by the King's younger brother who had been crowned as Louis XVIII, and Pellerin's great-grandson Arnaud III de La Porte was created a baron in recognition, in 1822. That title remains in the family to this day.

== Sources ==
- Based on the Dictionnaire Biographique Universel, article by Louis-Mayeul Chaudon and Antoine-François Delandine, translated with background interpolations and additions by R. Sekulovich.
