= Chapel of the Oblates =

Coordinates: 43.5268°N 5.4521°E

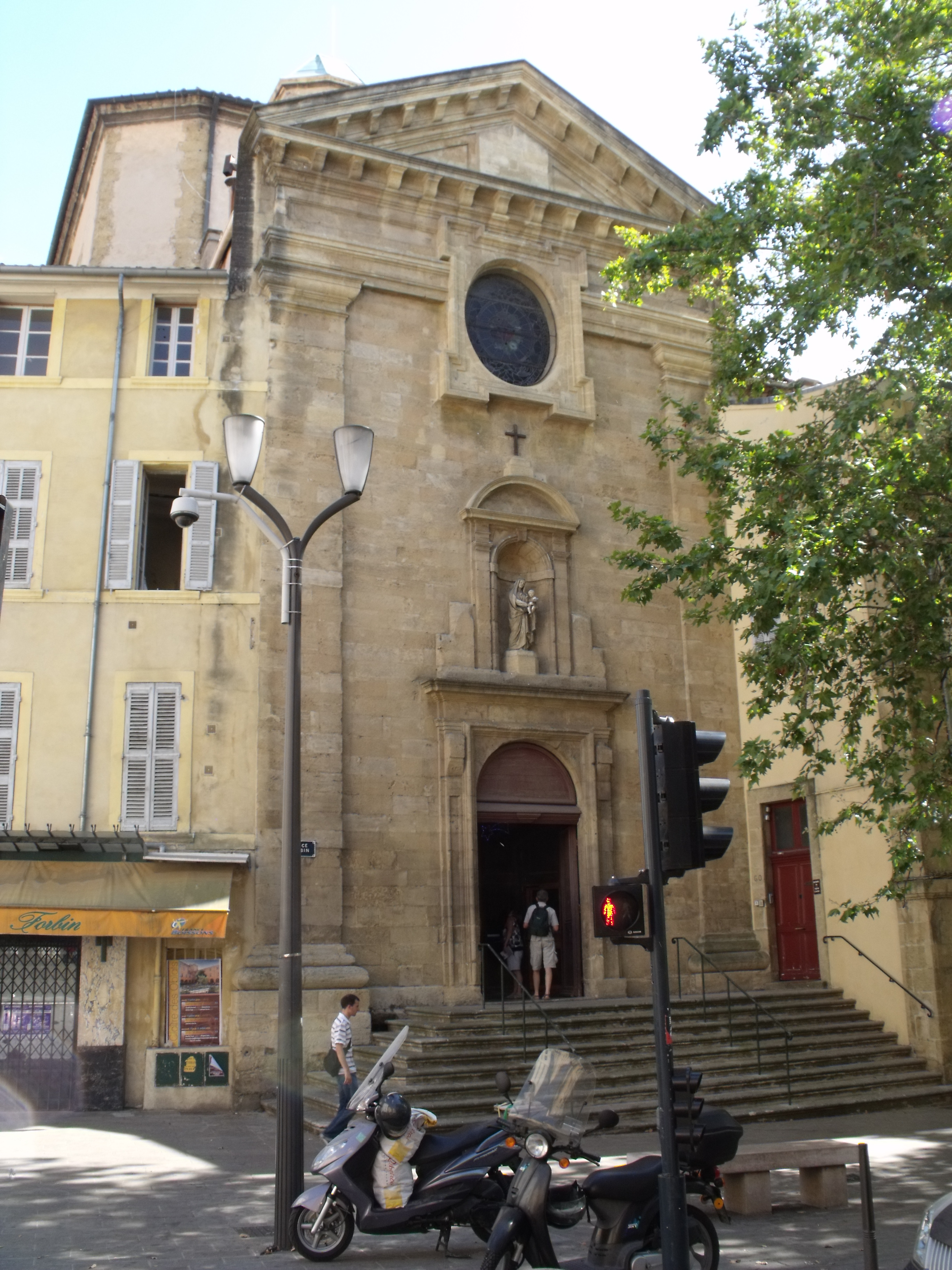
- Facade of the Chapel of the Oblates
- Chapel of the Oblates
- Location: Place Forbin; Aix-en-Provence; Bouches-du-Rhône, Provence-Alpes-Côte d'Azur
- Country: France
- Denomination: Roman Catholic Church

Architecture
- Heritage designation: Monument historique
- Architect(s): Thomas Veyrier; Laurent Vallon
- Architectural type: church
- Completed: 1701

Administration
- Archdeaconry: Roman Catholic Archdiocese of Aix

Clergy
- Archbishop: Christophe Dufour

The Chapel of the Oblates (French: Chapelle des Oblats) is a Roman Catholic chapel in Aix-en-Provence.

== Location ==
It is located on the Place Forbin, at the top of the Cours Mirabeau.

== History ==
The chapel was built on a former convent for the Carmelites, a Roman Catholic order, built in 1625. The new chapel building was designed by Thomas Veyrier (1658-1736) and constructed from 1695 to 1701. The facade was designed by Laurent Vallon (1652-1724) in 1697.

It continued to serve as a convent for the Carmelites until the French Revolution of 1789. Shortly after, Saint Eugène de Mazenod (1782-1861), the founder of the Missionary Oblates of Mary Immaculate, a Roman Catholic order, purchased it and used it to train young priests and re-evangelize peasants throughout Provence. Inside the church, there is a sculpture of Saint Mazenod.

It has been listed as a monument historique since 1911.

== At present ==
It serves as the international home of the Missionary Oblates of Mary Immaculate. It is served by four priests and one brother. Mass is said every weekday at 7am, and on Sundays at 9am and 11am.

== Gallery ==
Chapel of the Oblates
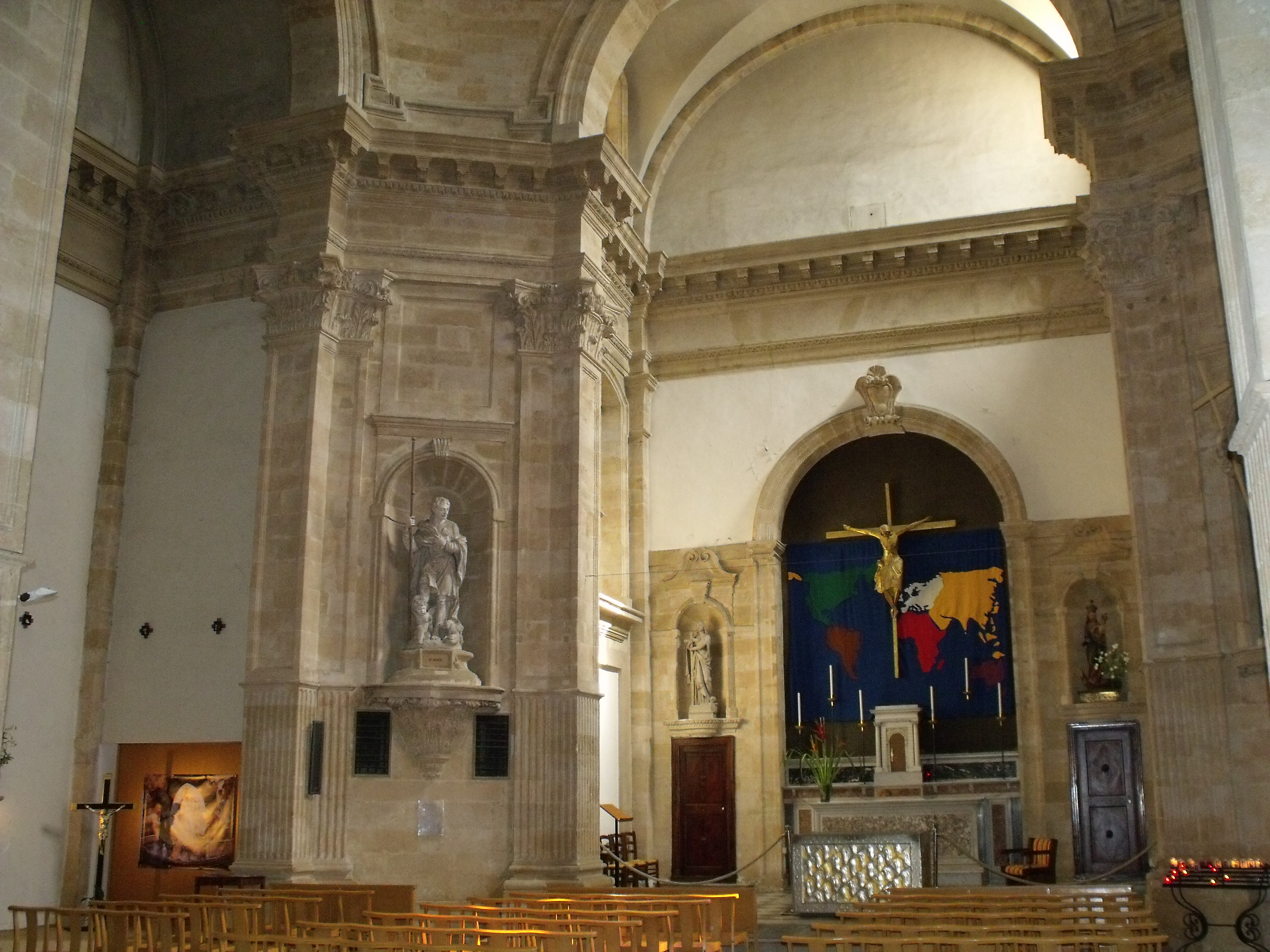
Inside the Chapel of the Oblates

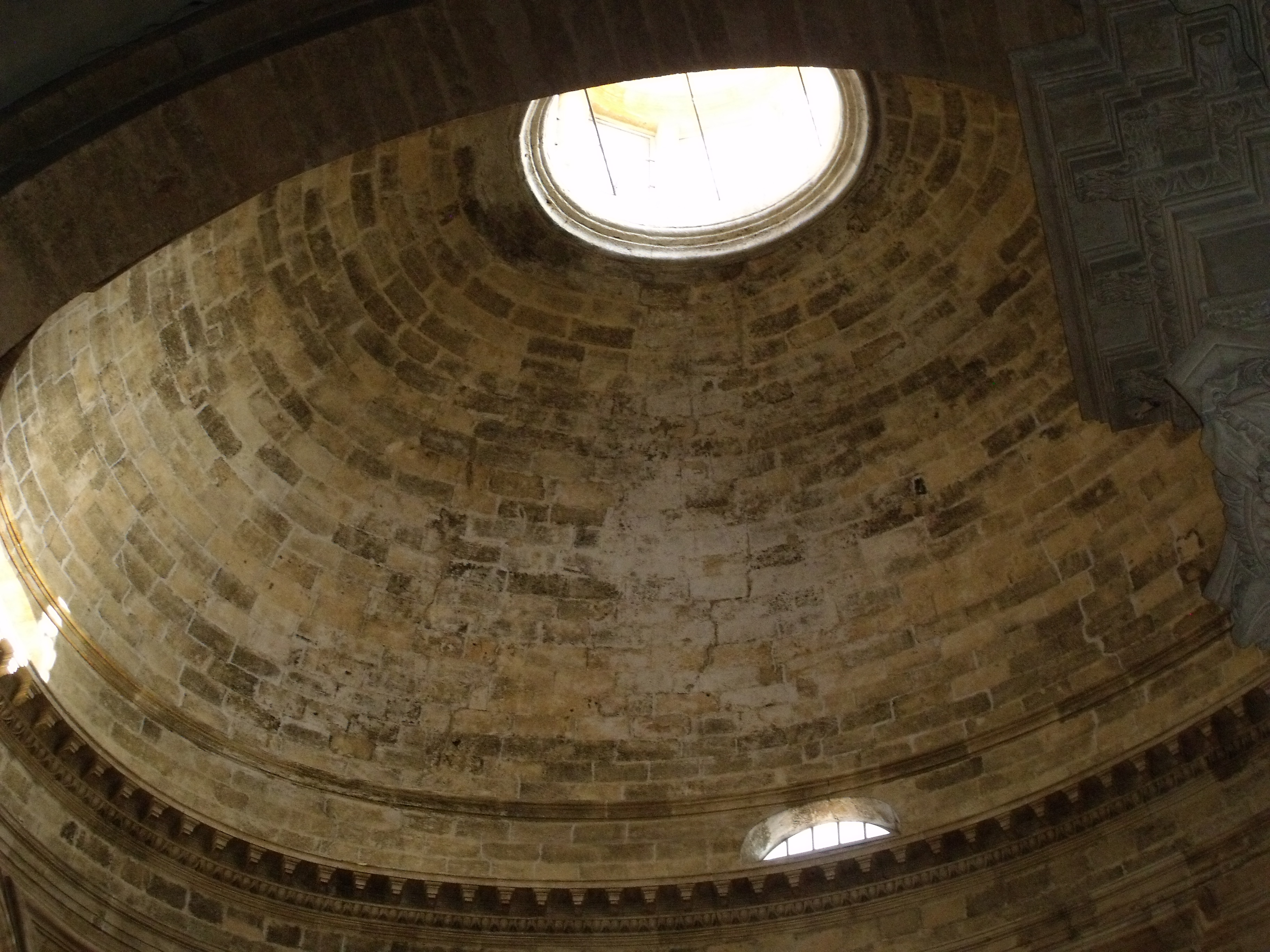
Ceiling inside the Chapel of the Oblates

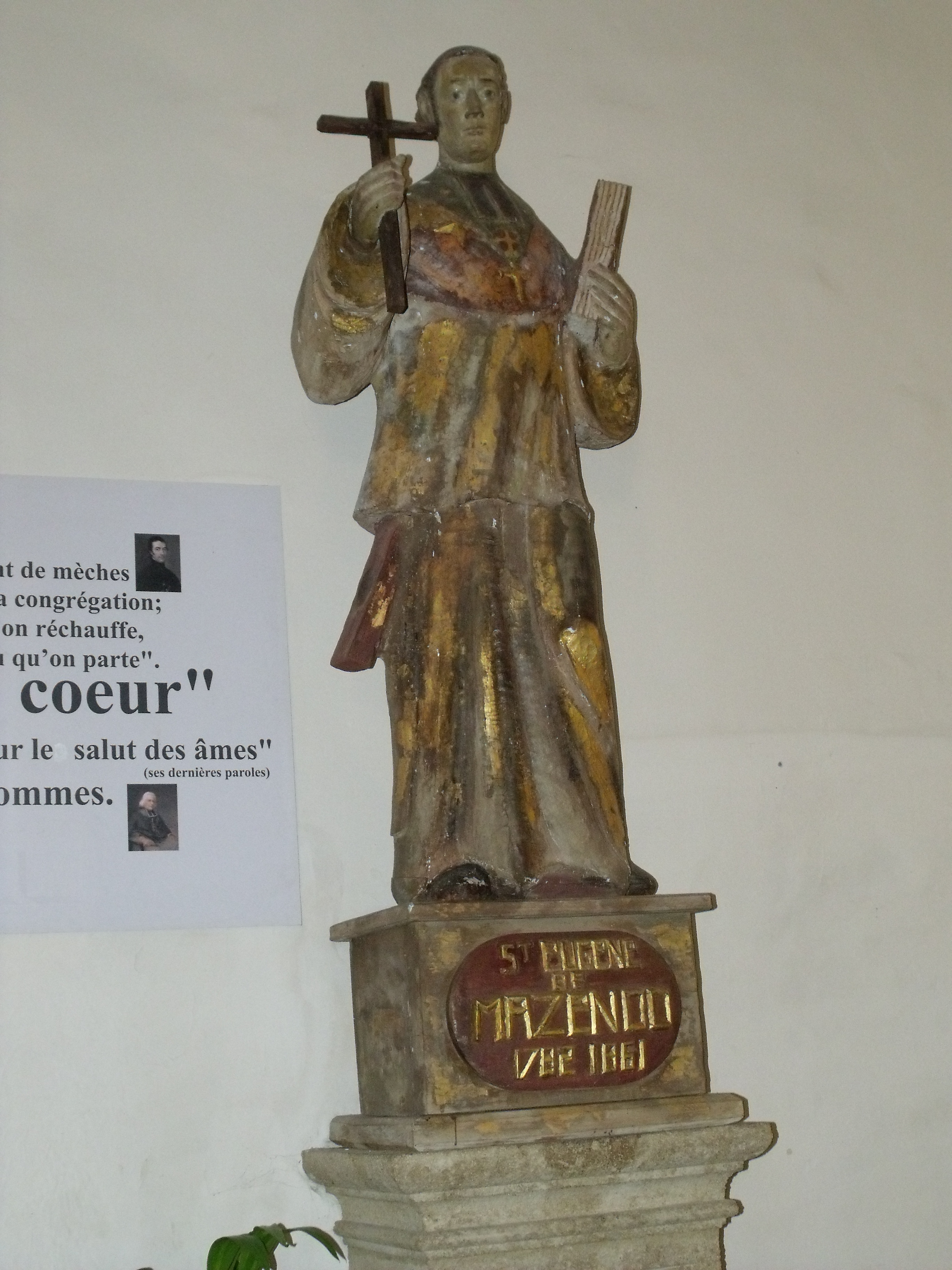
Statue of Eugène de Mazenod inside the Chapel of the Oblates
