= Delaporte =

Delaporte is a surname of French origin. Notable people with the surname include:

- Arthur Delaporte (born 1991), French politician
- Charles Delaporte (1880–1949), French rower and cyclist
  - Charles Delaporte (musician), member of Caravan Palace
- Florence Delaporte, French writer, winner of the 1998 Prix Wepler
- Louis Delaporte, French explorer and artist
- Louis Joseph Delaporte, French archaeologist
- Philip Delaporte, German-American Protestant missionary and translator
- Sophie Delaporte, French photographer and artist
- Delaporte, Spanish and Italian electronic music band based in Madrid, created by Sandra Delaporte and Sergio Salvi

== See also ==
- De La Porte
- Laporte (disambiguation)
