= Saint-Jean-Baptiste, La Porta =

Church in La Porta, France

Coordinates: 42°25′23″N 9°21′10″E

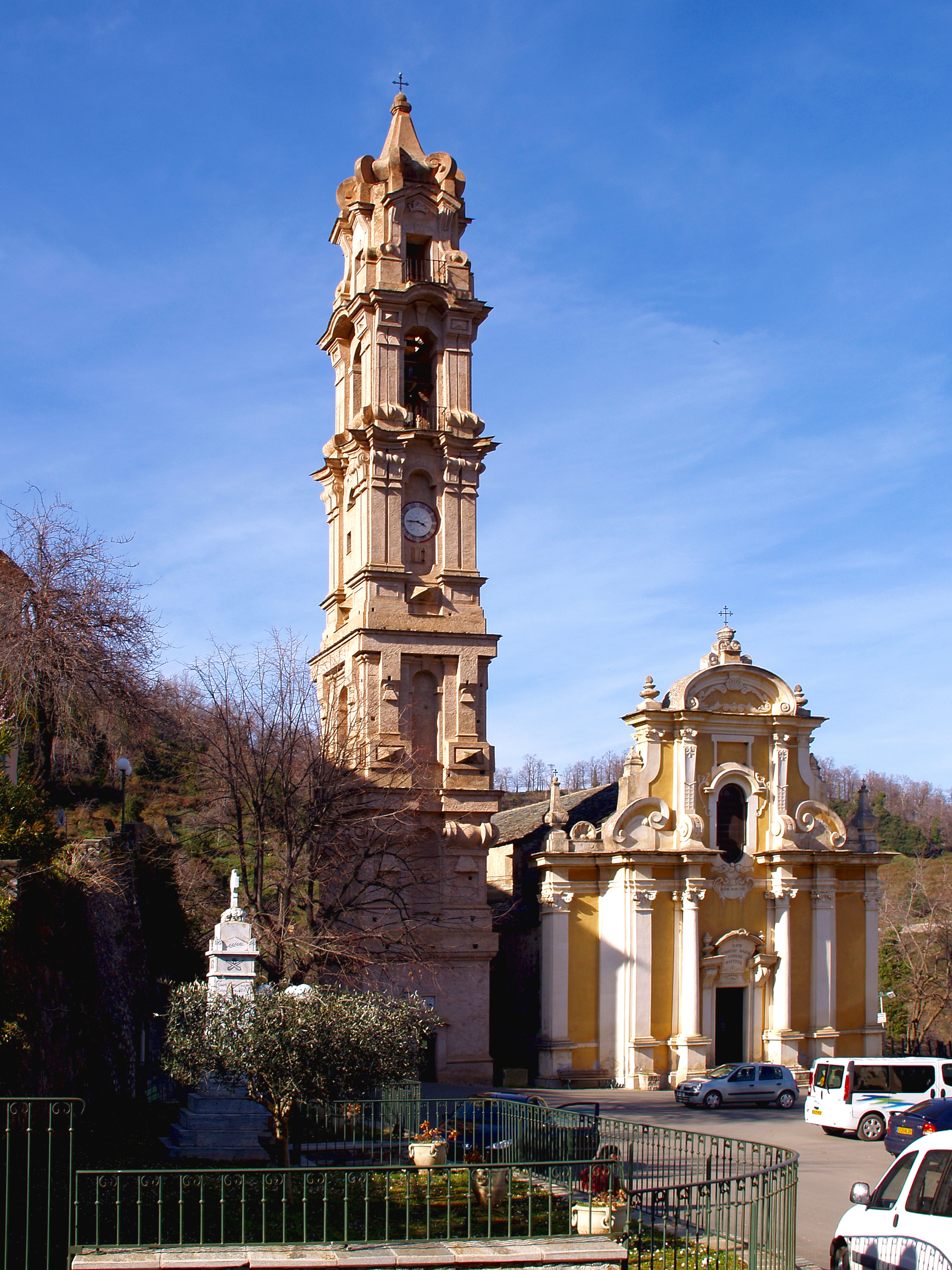

Église Saint-Jean-Baptiste de La Porta is a Roman Catholic church in La Porta, Haute-Corse, Corsica. The 18th-century building was classified as a Historic Monument in 1975.
