= Isidro de Laporta =

Spanish composer and guitarist

Isidro de Laporta (sometimes La Porta or Porta) (1750–1808) was a Spanish composer and guitarist, active in Madrid during the first years of the 19th century.

Much of Laporta's compositional output is for his own instrument or for salterio, although he also wrote for violin and keyboard. In his day he appears to have been regarded as a major producer of works for guitar. He also composed for the stage, and it was said that his dance music was especially appealing. Known stage works include:

- La caracolera y el amolador
- La casa de los locos
- La sombra chinesca
- La zinga

Some of his music is preserved in the collections of the Madrid Conservatory and the city's municipal library.

Several guitar trios by Laporta were recorded along with similar pieces by Antonio Ximénez Brufal for release on the Hungaroton label.
