= La Porte, Haiti =

La Porte
- Village
- Location in Haiti
- Coordinates: 18.3153774°N 73.7218667°W
- Country: Haiti
- Department: Sud
- Arrondissement: Les Cayes
- Elevation: 126 m (413 ft)

La Porte (French pronunciation: [la pɔʁt]) is a village in the Les Cayes commune of the Les Cayes Arrondissement, in the Sud department of Haiti.
