= LaPorte CPAs and Business Advisors =

Accounting and advisory firm

- Type: Professional Corporation
- Industry: Accounting
- Founded: New Orleans, Louisiana, USA (1946)
- Headquarters: 111 Veterans Memorial Blvd., Suite 600; Metairie, Louisiana 70005
- Area served: Gulf Coast region
- Services: Accounting; Audit and assurance Consulting; Tax; Other
- Revenue: ▲$26.5 Million USD (2013)
- Website: https://www.laporte.com

LaPorte CPAs and Business Advisors is an accounting and business advisory firm based in New Orleans, USA. From 1973 until 2010, the company was known as LaPorte Sehrt Romig & Hand in the Gulf Coast region marketplace and is commonly referred to as LaPorte. The firm sells audit, tax, accounting, and consulting services. It belongs to the RSM US Alliance of companies.

== Milestones ==
2004 Merged with Smith, Huval & Associates, L.L.C., in Covington, Louisiana
2007 Merged with The Gautreau Group, L.L.C., in Baton Rouge, Louisiana, and established a Baton Rouge office.
2010 Merged with Hidalgo, Banfill, Zlotnik & Kermali, P.C., in Houston, Texas, and established a Houston office
2011 Changed firm name from LaPorte Sehrt Romig & Hand to LaPorte CPAs & Business Advisors
2015 Merged with Beyer, Stagni & Company in Houma, Louisiana
2017 Merged with Lanaux & Felger in Houma, Louisiana
2023 Merged with Gomez & Company in Houston, Texas

== National Industry Recognition ==
- INSIDE Public Accounting named LaPorte one of the “Top 200 Accounting Firms” for 2010, 2011, 2012, 2013, 2014, 2015, and 2016.
- Accountants Media Group, publishers of Accounting Today, included LaPorte among 35 national “Beyond the Top 100: Firms to Watch” and rated LaPorte ninth of 17 on the journal’s “2013 Regional Leaders” among Gulf Coast firms.
- Accountants Media Group, publishers of Accounting Today, named LaPorte one of the “Best Accounting Firms to Work for” in the United States for four consecutive years (2008, 2009, 2010, and 2011).

== Local Recognition ==
New Orleans CityBusiness included LaPorte on its list of “Best Places to Work” for seven consecutive years (2007 to 2015).
Named to New Orleans Times-Picayune 2016 Top Workplaces-midsize Employers List

== Legal Structure ==
LaPorte is structured as A Professional Accounting Corporation (APAC).
