= Laurent Vallon =

French architect

- Born: 1652
- Died: 1724 (aged 71–72)
- Occupation: Architect
- Children: Georges Vallon

Laurent Vallon (1652–1724) was a French architect, mostly active in the Provence. Many of his buildings are now listed as monuments historiques.

== Biography ==
=== Early life ===
Laurent Vallon was born in 1652. He received his training from Jacques and Jean Drusian.

=== Career ===
He designed several Hôtel particuliers. In Aix-en-Provence, he was commissioned by Henri Reynaud d'Albertas (1674-1746) to design the Hôtel d'Albertas with Jean Lombard, which is listed as Monument historique. It is located on the Place d'Albertas, which was designed by his son Georges and is also listed. Together with Jean Daret and Jean Jaubert, he also designed the Hôtel d'Olivary located at 10 rue du Quatre-Septembre, also listed. He also designed the facade of the Hôtel de Grimaldi-Régusse, a listed building located at 26, rue de l'Opéra.

Additionally, he designed several Roman Catholic convents and a church. Together with Joseph Jaubert and Jean Vallon, he designed the Collège Mignet located on the rue Cardinale, then two Roman Catholic convents known as Couvent des Bénédictines (for the Order of Saint Benedict) and Couvent des Ursulines (for the Ursulines); it is listed. On his own, he designed another convent, this time for the Jesuits, known as the Couvent des Jésuites located at 20 rue Lacépède, which is also listed. Additionally, with Thomas Veyrier (1658-1736), he designed the Chapel of the Oblates located at 52-60 Cours Mirabeau, also listed. Moreover, he designed the Église de la Madeleine in Aix, which was built from 1691 to 1703. He also designed the Église Saint-Jean-Baptiste du Faubourg, located at 36 cours Sextius in Aix, built from 1697 to 1702, and listed since 1983.

With his son, he designed the Halle aux grains, another listed building since 1983, which was built from 1717 to 1759 and now houses a post office and a library.

In Marignane, together with Jean Daret, he designed the Château des Covet, which now serves as the townhall, also listed.

=== Personal life ===
He had a son, Georges Vallon (1688-1767), who was also a renowned architect. He died in 1724.

== Gallery ==
Buildings designed by Laurent Vallon
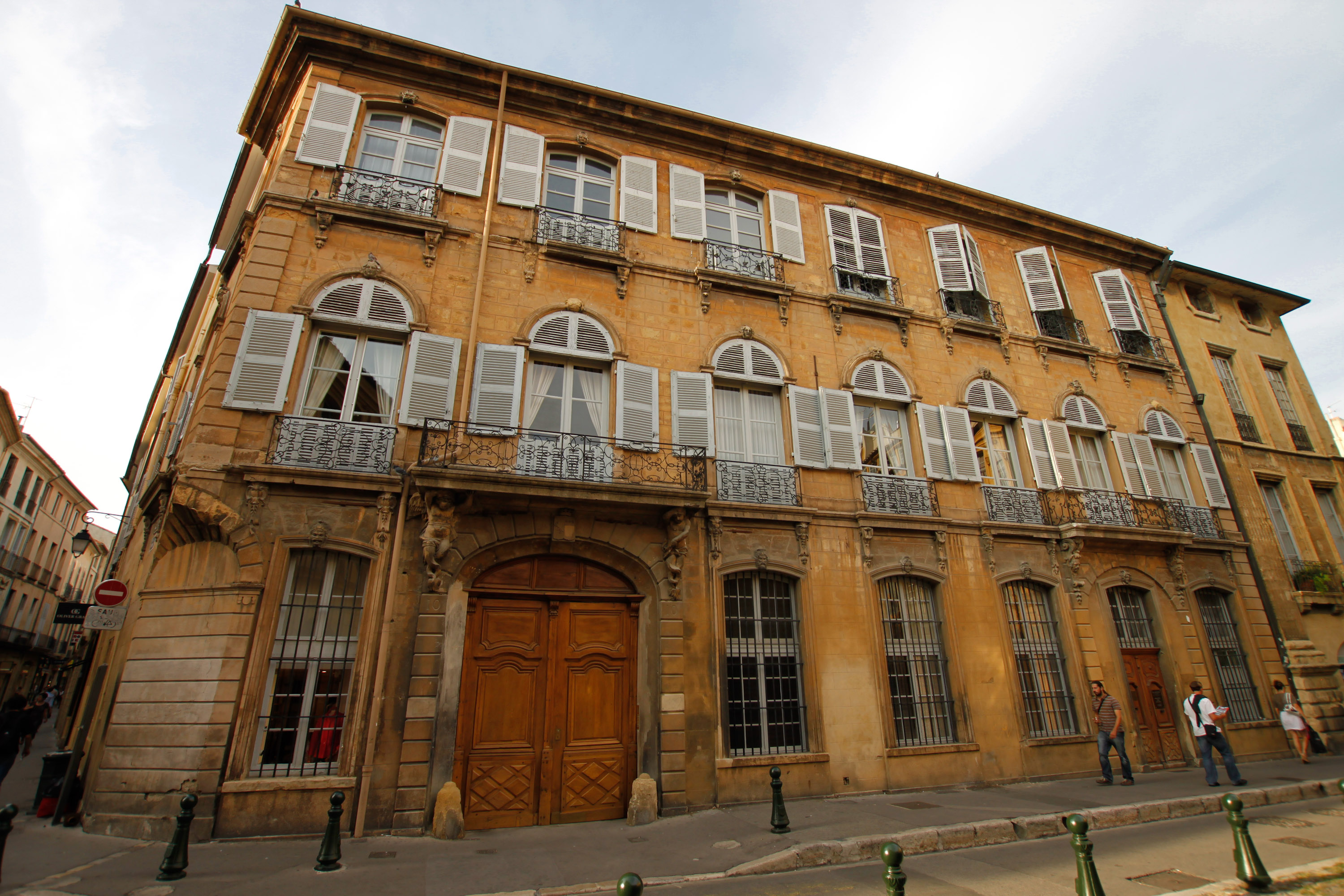
Hôtel d'Albertas (designed with Jean Lombard) in Aix-en-Provence

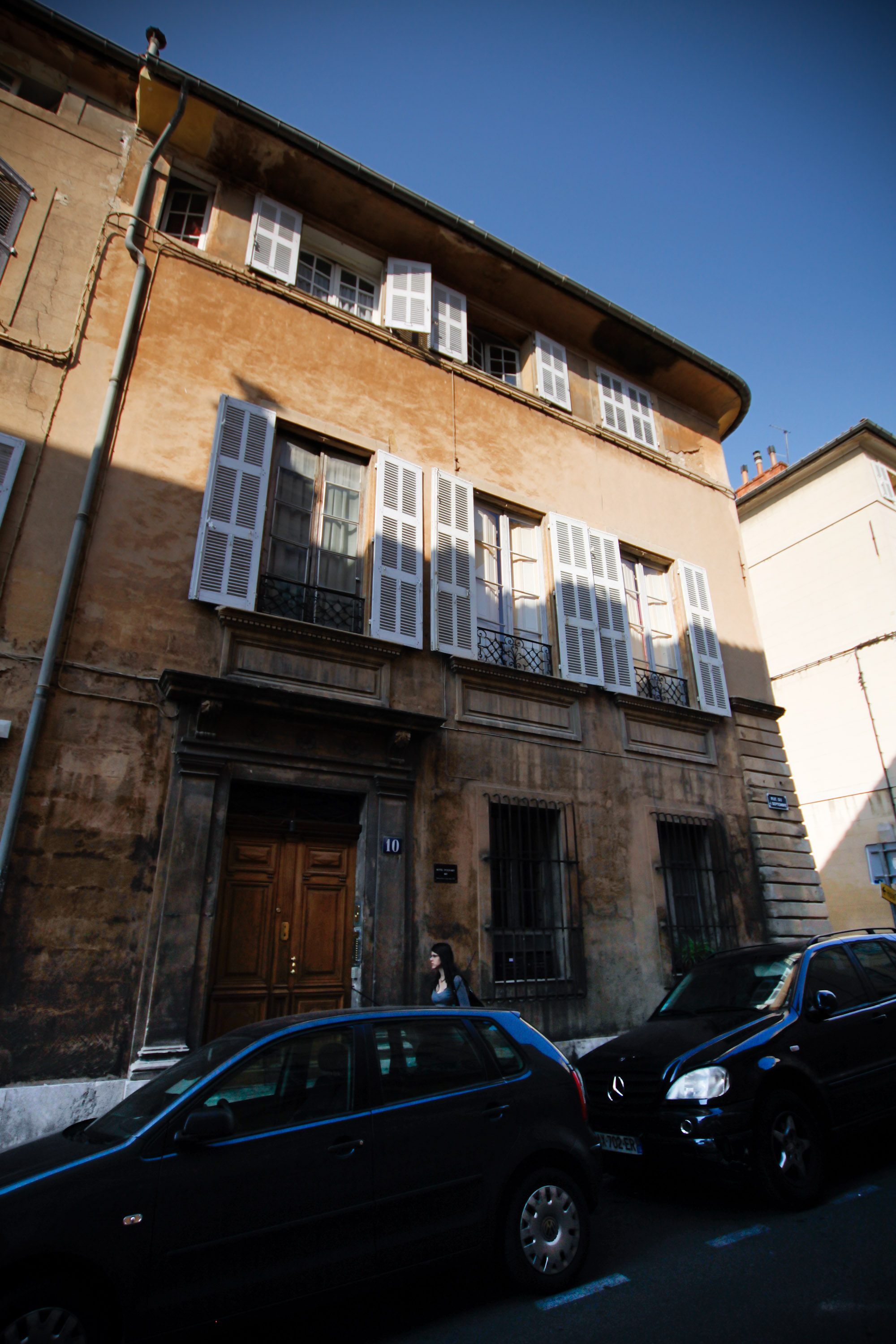
Hôtel d'Olivary (designed with Jean Daret and Jean Jaubert) in Aix-en-Provence

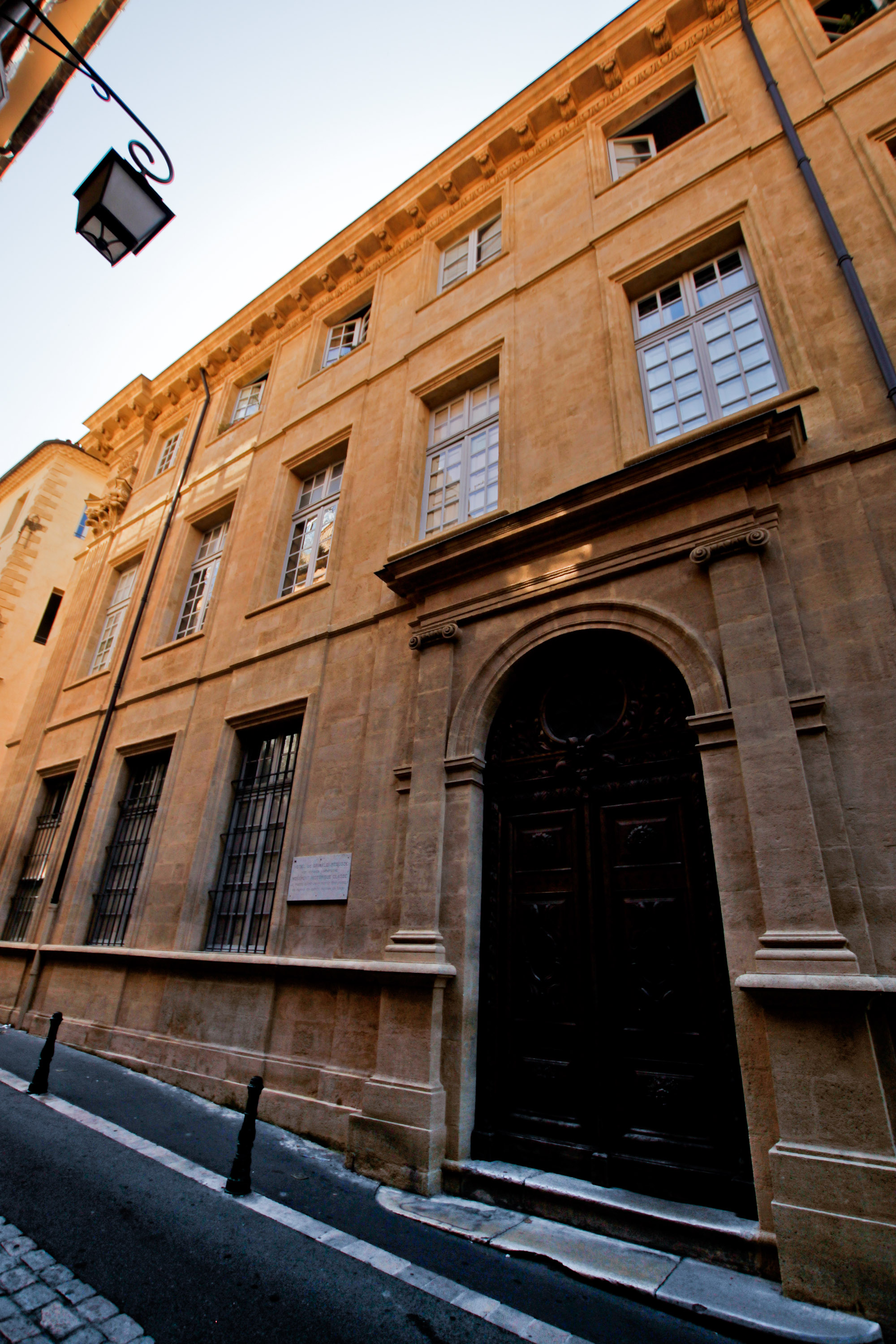
Hôtel de Grimaldi-Régusse in Aix-en-Provence, whose facade he designed

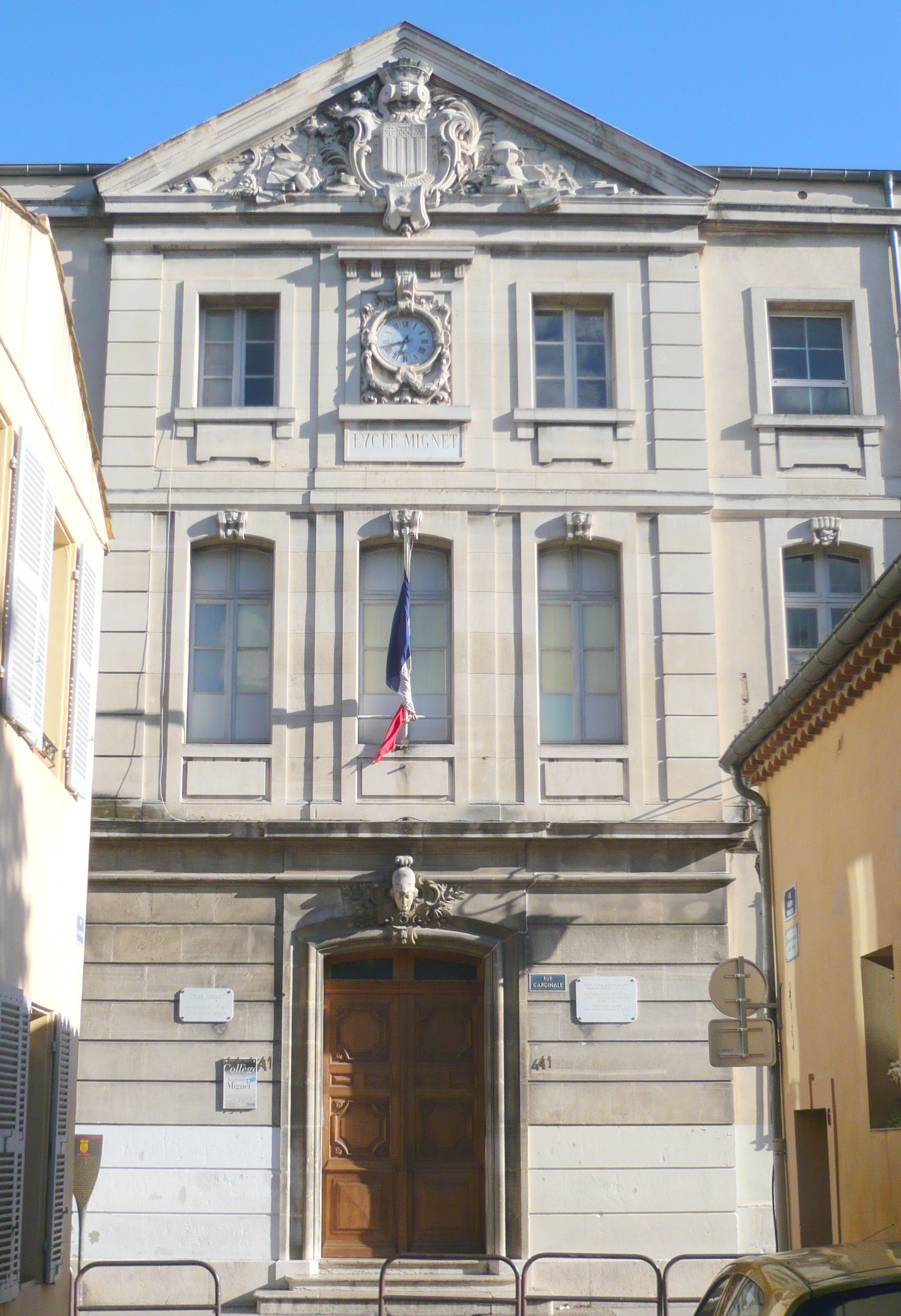
Collège Mignet, formerly the Couvent des Bénédictines and the Couvent des Ursulines, (designed with Joseph Jaubert and Jean Vallon) in Aix-en-Provence

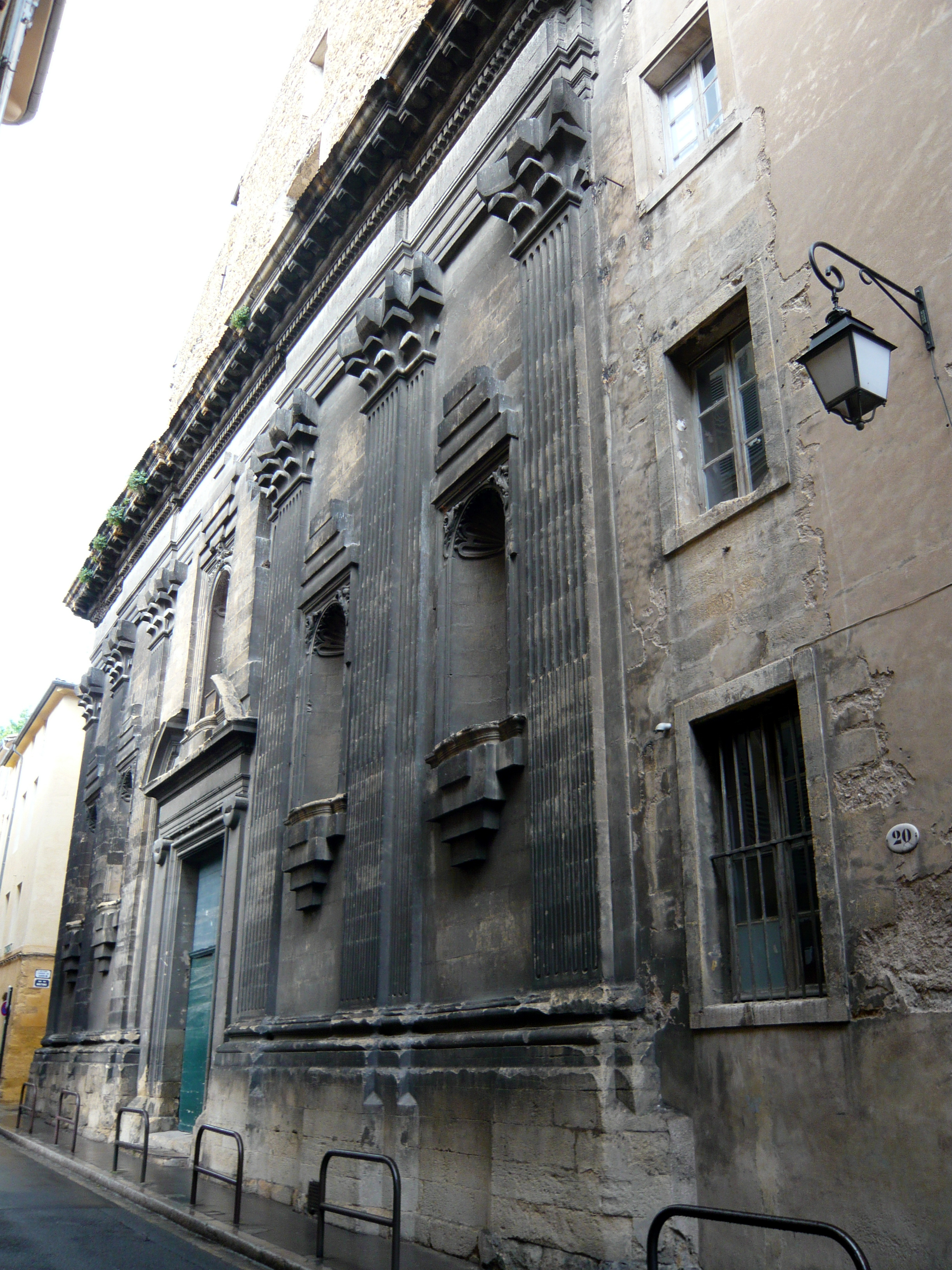
Couvent des Jésuites in Aix-en-Provence

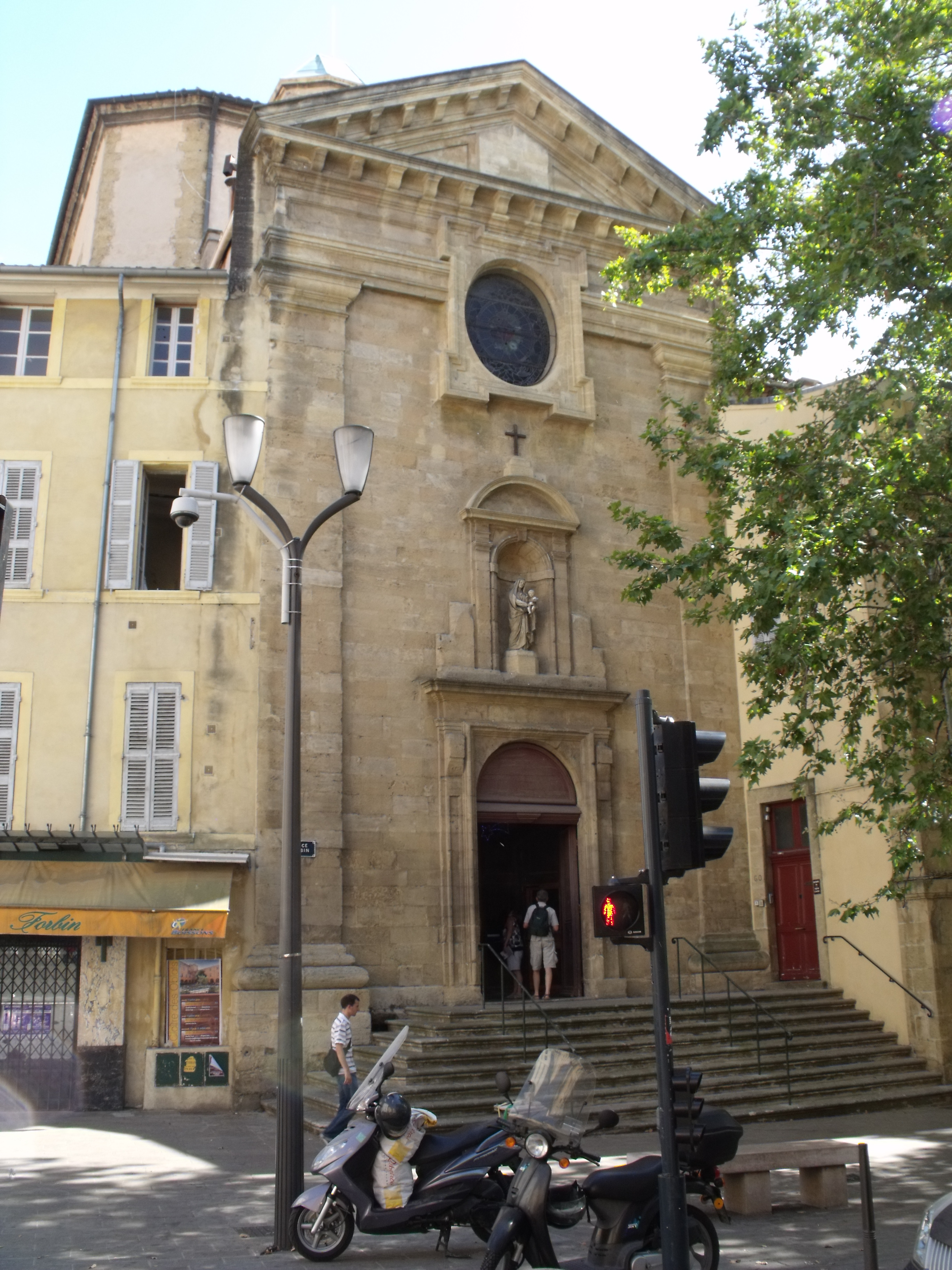
Facade of the Chapel of the Oblates in Aix-en-Provence

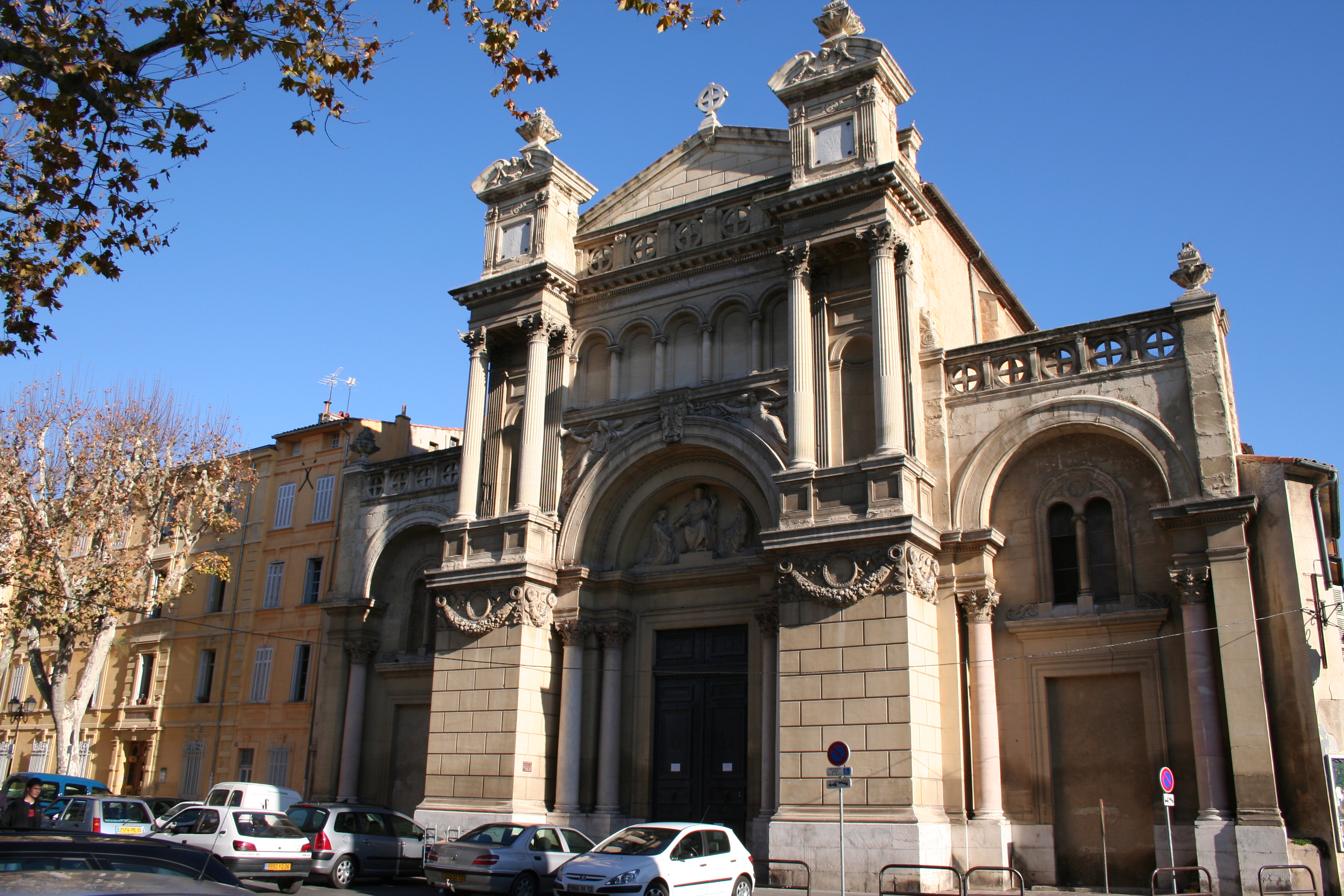
Église de la Madeleine (facade by Henri Révoil) in Aix-en-Provence

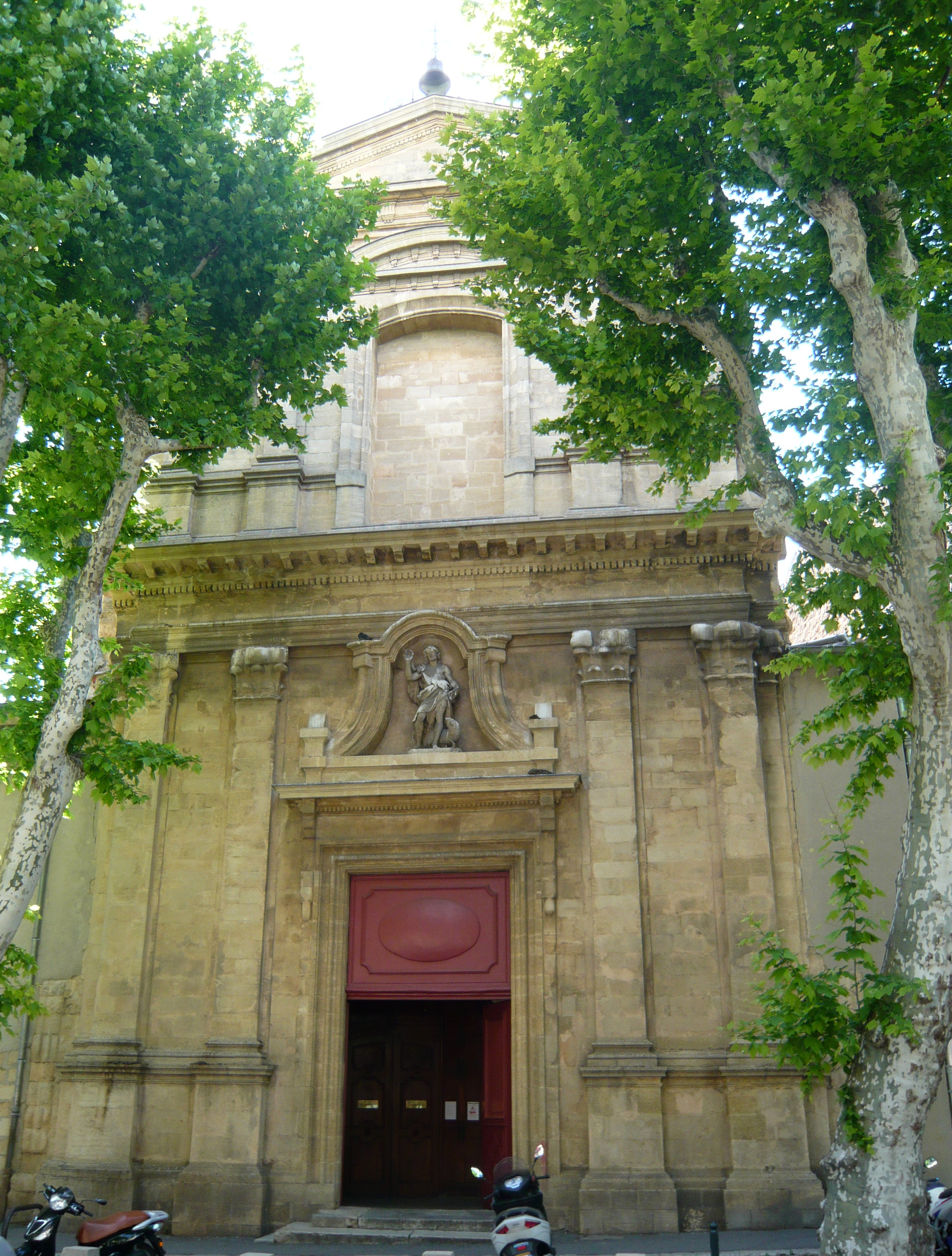
Église Saint-Jean-Baptiste du Faubourg in Aix-en-Provence

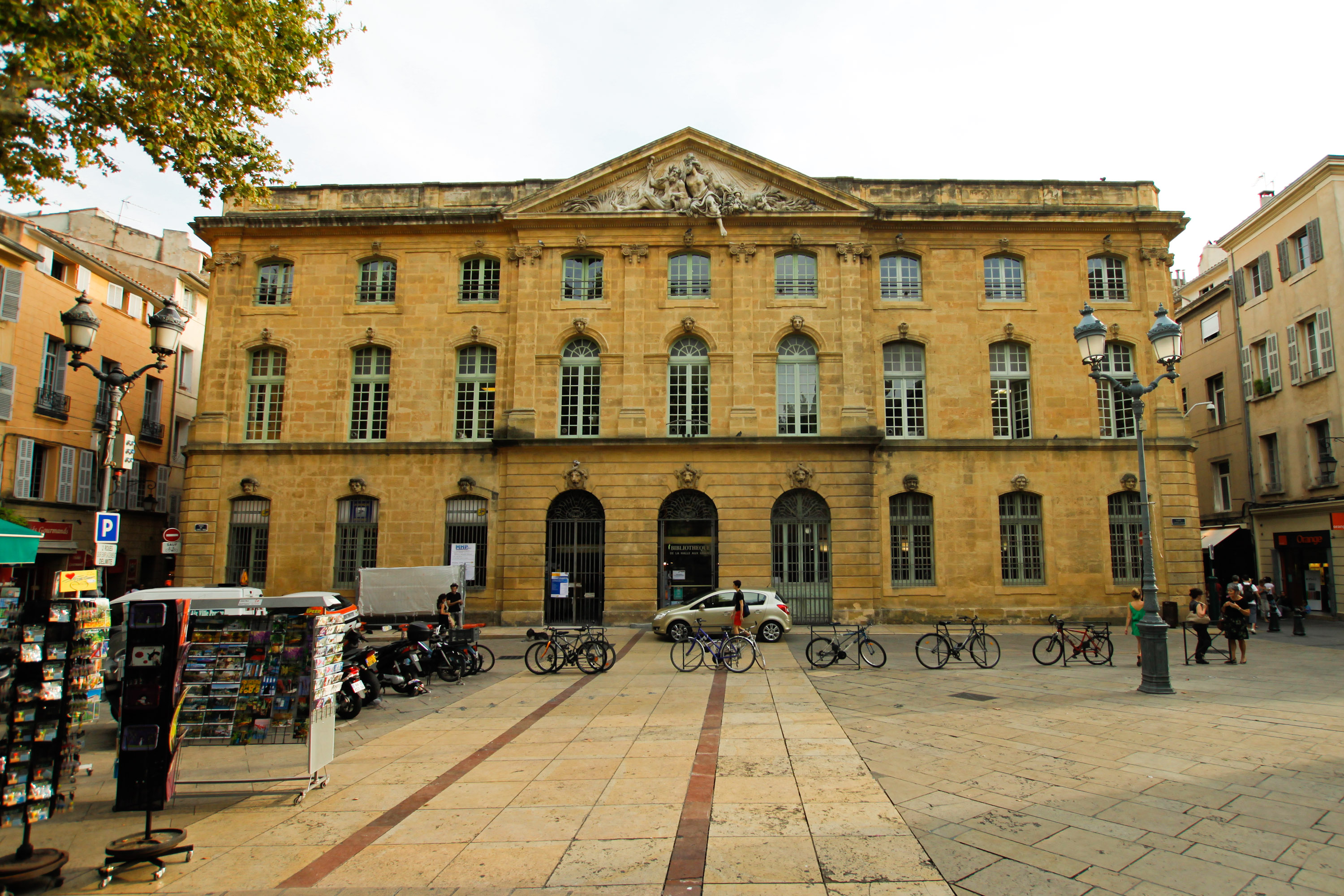
Halle aux grains (designed with his son) in Aix-en-Provence
