= Antonio Ximénez Brufal =

Spanish composer and violinist

Antonio Ximénez Brufal (23 December 1751 – 10 March 1826) was a Spanish composer and violinist from Alicante.

Born into a family of musicians, Ximénez became a violinist at the chapel of the Colegiata de San Nicolás de Alicante at the age of eighteen. In 1776 he took a position as first violin in the Italian opera troupe of Teresa Taveggia, which was touring Spain at the time. The company suffered a number of setbacks thanks to ecclesiastical authorities, but even so Ximénez was so well-regarded that Carlos III invited him to spend a year at the royal court. At the end of the sojourn he returned to Alicante to his position at the chapel of San Nicolás, remaining there until his death. As a composer Ximénez composed music along classical lines. Among his compositions were a set of sonatas for violin and basso continuo and four trios for guitar, violin, and basso continuo, published in Paris in 1789. Several of these have been recorded on the Hungaroton label, coupled with similar works by Isidro de Laporta.

Ximénez was the brother of composer Joaquín Nicolás Ximénez Brufal; several of their works have recently been republished.
