= La Porta =

- Commune
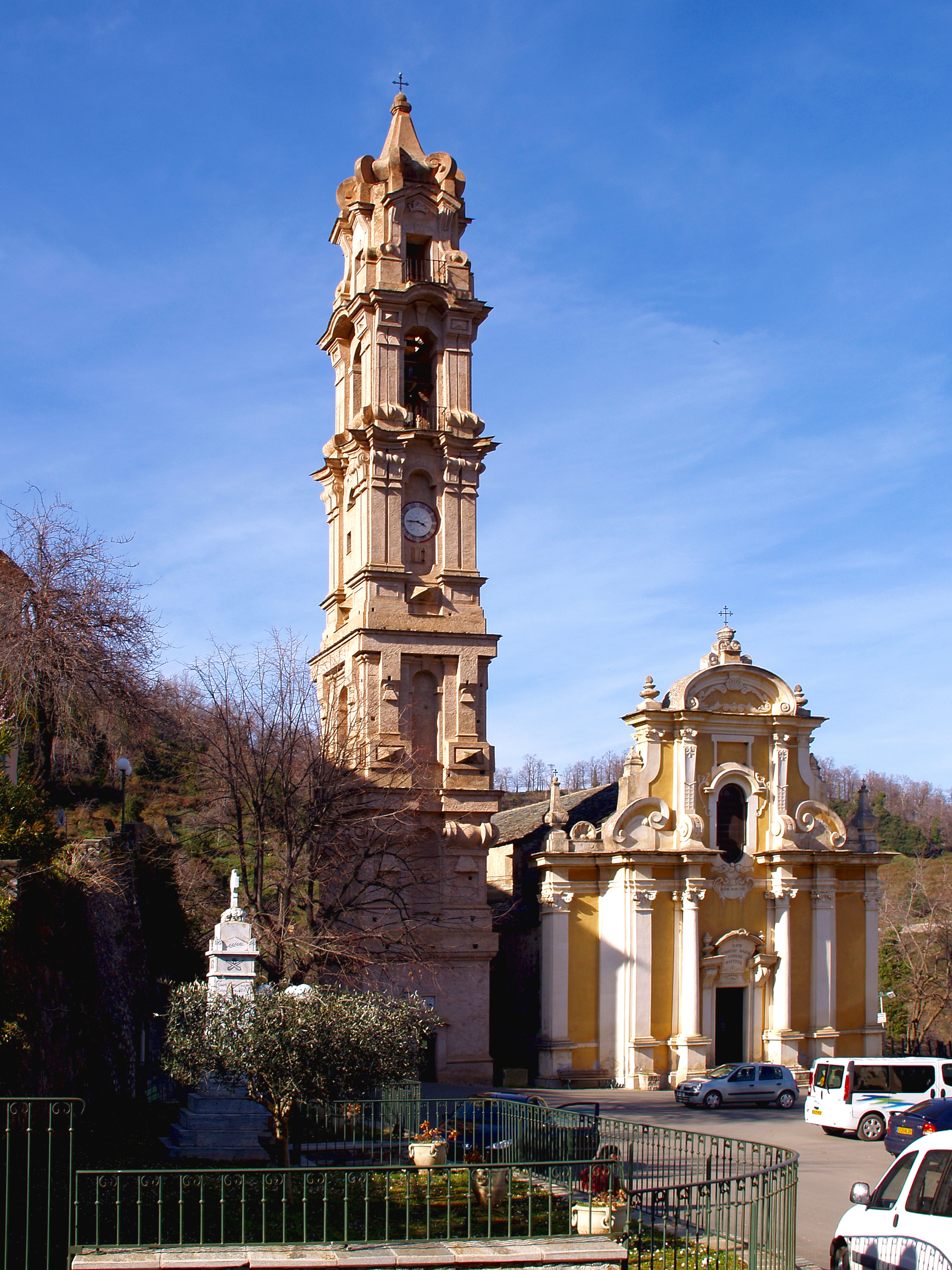
- Church of Saint Jean-Baptiste
- Location of La Porta
- Location within France Location within Corsica
- Coordinates: 42°25′25″N 9°21′12″E
- Country: France
- Region: Corsica
- Department: Haute-Corse
- Arrondissement: Corte
- Canton: Casinca-Fumalto

Government
  - Mayor (2020–2026): Pascal Biaggi
- Area^{1}: 5.16 km^{2} (1.99 sq mi)
- Elevation: 520 m (1,710 ft)
- Highest elevation: 1,373 m (4,505 ft)
- Lowest elevation: 220 m (720 ft)
- Population (2023): 187
  - Density: 36.2/km^{2} (93.9/sq mi)
- Time zone: UTC+01:00 (CET)
  - Summer (DST): UTC+02:00 (CEST)
- INSEE/Postal code: 2B246 /20237
- ^{1} French Land Register data, which excludes lakes, ponds, glaciers > 1 km^{2} (0.386 sq mi or 247 acres) and river estuaries.

La Porta (Italian pronunciation: [la ˌpɔrta], French: [la pɔʁta]; Corsican: A Porta d'Ampugnani) is a commune in the Haute-Corse department of France on the island of Corsica.

La Porta is situated in the heart of the Castagniccia, of which this is the largest settlement. It formed the gateway (porta) to the ancient pieve of Ampugnani.

== Geography ==
Part of the canton of the Fiumalto d'Ampugnani, La Porta on its spur of Monte San Petrone is sheltered among the chestnut woodlands on the slopes. This most remote and isolated area of north-western Corsica retains the last extensive stands of the old-growth chestnut forest that gave its name to the Castagniccia region (castagna, "chestnut"); the depopulation it has experienced since ca 1870, to 196 persons in 1999, have had the effect of preserving the traditional landscape.

The hamlet of Poggiale, part of the commune which contains its reservoir, is sited somewhat further up the slope. To the northeast the village of Quercitello looks down upon La Porta. To the east, it faces the adjoining village of Ficaja.

=== Climate ===
La Porta has a warm-summer mediterranean climate (Köppen climate classification Csb). The average annual temperature in La Porta is 12.7 °C (54.9 °F). The average annual rainfall is 918.7 mm (36.17 in) with December as the wettest month. The temperatures are highest on average in August, at around 21.2 °C (70.2 °F), and lowest in January, at around 5.5 °C (41.9 °F). The highest temperature ever recorded in La Porta was 36.0 °C (96.8 °F) on 11 August 2003; the coldest temperature ever recorded was −9.0 °C (15.8 °F) on 9 January 1995.

Climate data for La Porta (1981–2010 averages, extremes 1980−2014)
Month	Jan	Feb	Mar	Apr	May	Jun	Jul	Aug	Sep	Oct	Nov	Dec	Year
Record high °C (°F)	21.0 (69.8)	22.5 (72.5)	27.0 (80.6)	26.5 (79.7)	32.0 (89.6)	32.7 (90.9)	35.0 (95.0)	36.0 (96.8)	31.5 (88.7)	26.5 (79.7)	24.5 (76.1)	21.0 (69.8)	36.0 (96.8)
Mean daily maximum °C (°F)	8.6 (47.5)	9.2 (48.6)	11.9 (53.4)	14.9 (58.8)	19.5 (67.1)	22.9 (73.2)	26.2 (79.2)	26.0 (78.8)	21.6 (70.9)	16.9 (62.4)	12.2 (54.0)	9.3 (48.7)	16.6 (61.9)
Daily mean °C (°F)	5.5 (41.9)	5.7 (42.3)	8.1 (46.6)	10.8 (51.4)	14.9 (58.8)	18.3 (64.9)	21.2 (70.2)	21.2 (70.2)	17.5 (63.5)	13.5 (56.3)	9.3 (48.7)	6.5 (43.7)	12.7 (54.9)
Mean daily minimum °C (°F)	2.5 (36.5)	2.2 (36.0)	4.3 (39.7)	6.7 (44.1)	10.3 (50.5)	13.6 (56.5)	16.2 (61.2)	16.5 (61.7)	13.4 (56.1)	10.1 (50.2)	6.3 (43.3)	3.8 (38.8)	8.9 (48.0)
Record low °C (°F)	−9.0 (15.8)	−7.0 (19.4)	−7.0 (19.4)	−1.5 (29.3)	1.5 (34.7)	5.0 (41.0)	7.0 (44.6)	5.0 (41.0)	5.0 (41.0)	1.0 (33.8)	−3.0 (26.6)	−7.0 (19.4)	−9.0 (15.8)
Average precipitation mm (inches)	83.3 (3.28)	60.8 (2.39)	78.2 (3.08)	93.8 (3.69)	68.6 (2.70)	38.4 (1.51)	22.9 (0.90)	32.1 (1.26)	73.2 (2.88)	120.1 (4.73)	117.4 (4.62)	129.9 (5.11)	918.7 (36.17)
Average precipitation days (≥ 1.0 mm)	7.3	7.2	7.1	8.2	6.3	4.4	2.6	3.7	5.6	7.8	9.8	9.6	79.8
Source: Meteociel

== History ==
The comparative prosperity of the 17th and 18th centuries was based on valuable timber exported from the chestnut forests and a leather industry based on chestnut tannins, while the sweet chestnut remained the staple crop of the common people, and chestnut flour was exported, though with very considerable annual variations, which led to uncertainties in the local economy.

== Population ==
Historical population
Year	Pop.	±% p.a.
1968	358	—
1975	382	+0.93%
1982	422	+1.43%
1990	248	−6.43%
1999	196	−2.58%
2007	240	+2.56%
2012	210	−2.64%
2017	193	−1.67%
2023	187	−0.52%
Source: INSEE

== Sights ==
In this compactly nucleated village, vernacular houses constructed from schist, fieldstone, and slate stand alongside stuccoed and painted structures, interspersed with several larger residencies belonging to local notables.

The church of Saint Jean Baptiste and its ambitious campanile are more than local landmarks, the pride of the village and the most famous masterpieces of the late Baroque architecture of Corsica. The church was built from 1680 and provided with a facade designed by the Milanese architect Domenico Baïna, which was completed about 1707. Baïna also designed the sumptuous campanile that rises in five stages to 45 meters, and is visible far and wide, finished about 1720. The interior frescoes en camaïeu were carried out in the 1880s by Girolamo dela Porta.

== Personalities ==
La Porta was the birthplace of Horace François Bastien Sébastiani de La Porta (1771–1851), a Corsican soldier and diplomat for Napoleon, and a politician who served as Naval Minister, Minister of Foreign Affairs, and Minister of State under the July Monarchy.

== Transportation ==
Corsican Routes D405 and D515 serve the village.

== See also ==
- Communes of the Haute-Corse department
- Laporta
