= Joaquín Nicolás Ximénez Brufal =

Spanish composer and violinist

Joaquín Nicolás Ximénez Brufal (1742 - 1791?) was a Spanish composer and violinist.

Little is known of Ximénez' life besides the fact that he was the brother of composer Antonio Ximénez Brufal. Born in Alicante, at an early age he replaced the regular first and second violinists in the orchestra of the chapel of the Colegiata de San Nicolás de Alicante. He is known to have later moved to London, where around 1772 some of his work was issued by the Welcker publishing house. He offered concerts at a number of London venues as well. The date and place of his death are unknown. Stylistically, Ximénez' work has been described as bearing hallmarks of the Mannheim School. One of his sonatas was dedicated to the Earl of Sandwich. Several pieces by Ximénez, along with a handful by his brother Antonio, have been recently republished.
