= Église Saint-Jean-Baptiste du Faubourg =

Coordinates: 43.5291°N 5.4436°E

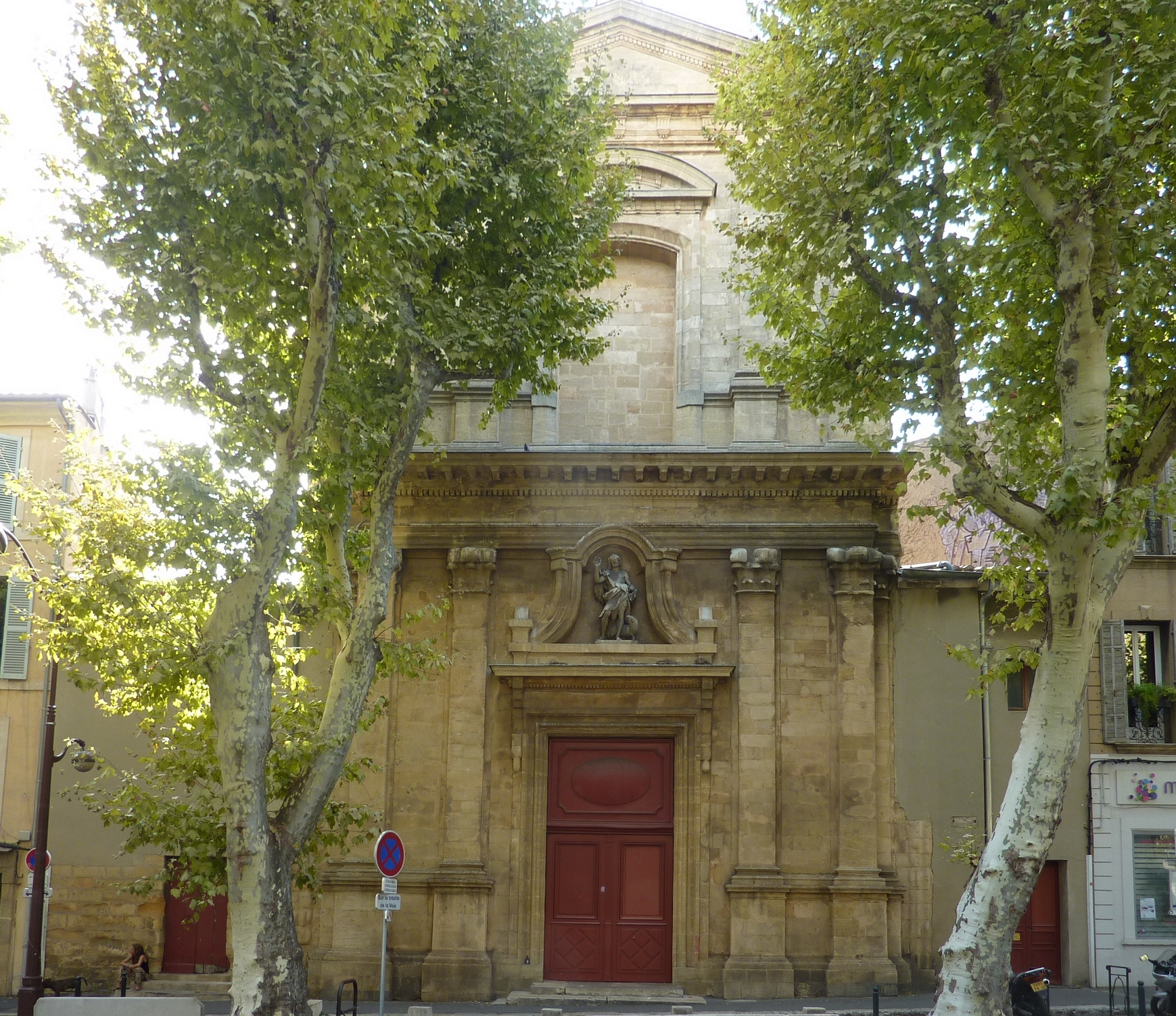
- Facade of the Église Saint-Jean-Baptiste du Faubourg
- Église Saint-Jean-Baptiste du Faubourg
- Location: 34 cours Sextius; Aix-en-Provence; Bouches-du-Rhône, Provence-Alpes-Côte d'Azur
- Country: France
- Denomination: Roman Catholic

Architecture
- Heritage designation: Monument historique
- Architect: Laurent Vallon
- Architectural type: church
- Completed: 1702; 324 years ago

The Église Saint-Jean-Baptiste du Faubourg is a Roman Catholic church in Aix-en-Provence.

== Location ==
The church building is located at 36 cours Sextius in Aix-en-Provence.

== History ==
The church was built on an old church building. It was designed by architect Laurent Vallon (1652-1724), and built from 1697 to 1702. Its construction was partly funded by a donation from Jean-Baptiste Duchaine, a canon in Aix. The building itself is shaped like a Greek cross. It was expanded in the nineteenth century.

Inside the church, the altar dates back to the eighteenth century. Additionally, the pulpit inside the church was designed by Jean-Baptiste Rambot. A painting by Charles de La Fosse (1636-1716) was donated to the church in 1821. There are also two paintings by Michel Serre (1658–1733).

Painter Paul Cézanne (1839–1906) married Hortense Fiquet in this church.

== At present ==
In December 2013, a traditional Mass was said in provençal to celebrate the santons.

== Heritage significance ==
It has been listed as a monument historique since 1983.
