= Arnaud I de La Porte =

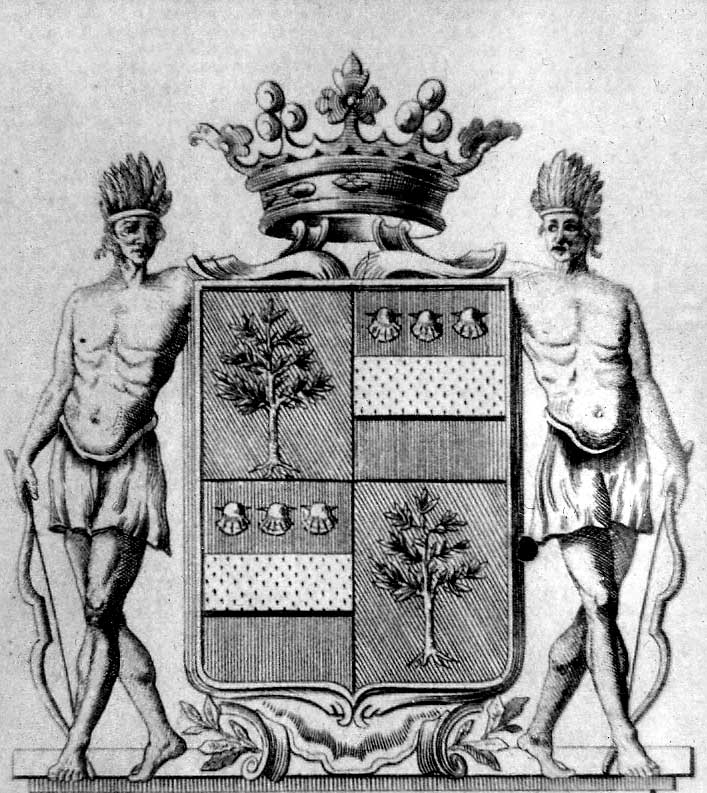
The de La Porte arms, engraved by his son, the bishop of Carcassonne

Arnaud I de Laporte (c. 1706, Bayonne, France – 1770, Versailles) was a French administrator in New France (parts of present-day Canada and the US).

== Early life and career ==
According to Laffilard, archivist of the Marine, as the French Navy was known, Arnaud de La Porte was born around 1706, near Bayonne, (no doubt in the family home at Lembeye, a village a few miles from Pau in the province of Béarn in the foothills of the Pyrenées). Laffilard says that "...recognizing that his son had spirit and drive, his father Jean sent him to Paris, entrusting him to Pierre de Casamajor, a physician from his province, to teach him the ins and outs of government officialdom so as to be able to acquire a favourable position within it.

The doctor placed him with a Solicitor to the Councils where he quickly learned the ropes. In 1731 he then introduced him to his friend Pierre de Forcade, at that time First Commissioner of the Colonial Office, who took an immediate liking to him and hired him as a clerk in his office. French colonial affairs fell within the purview of the Ministry of the Marine at that time, since the navy was the only conduit of supplies. Little by little, La Porte made himself known to the Minister, Jean-Frédéric Phélypeaux, comte de Maurepas, and to Joseph Pellerin, a former Commissioner of the Marine and now Minister of State, who enjoyed Maurepas' entire confidence. With Pellerin's protection and influence, over the next five years he rose within the office, and was promoted in 1736 to First Scrivener and then to Commissioner of the Marine year later."

This was about as high as someone not born into a great noble house could hope rise, and doing so within such a short span of time and at thirty, (even with a powerful patron), is a testament to his talent and drive. Patron and protégé became family on January 23, 1737, when in Versailles, at the age of twenty-one, Arnaud married Pellerin's daughter Marie-Anne.

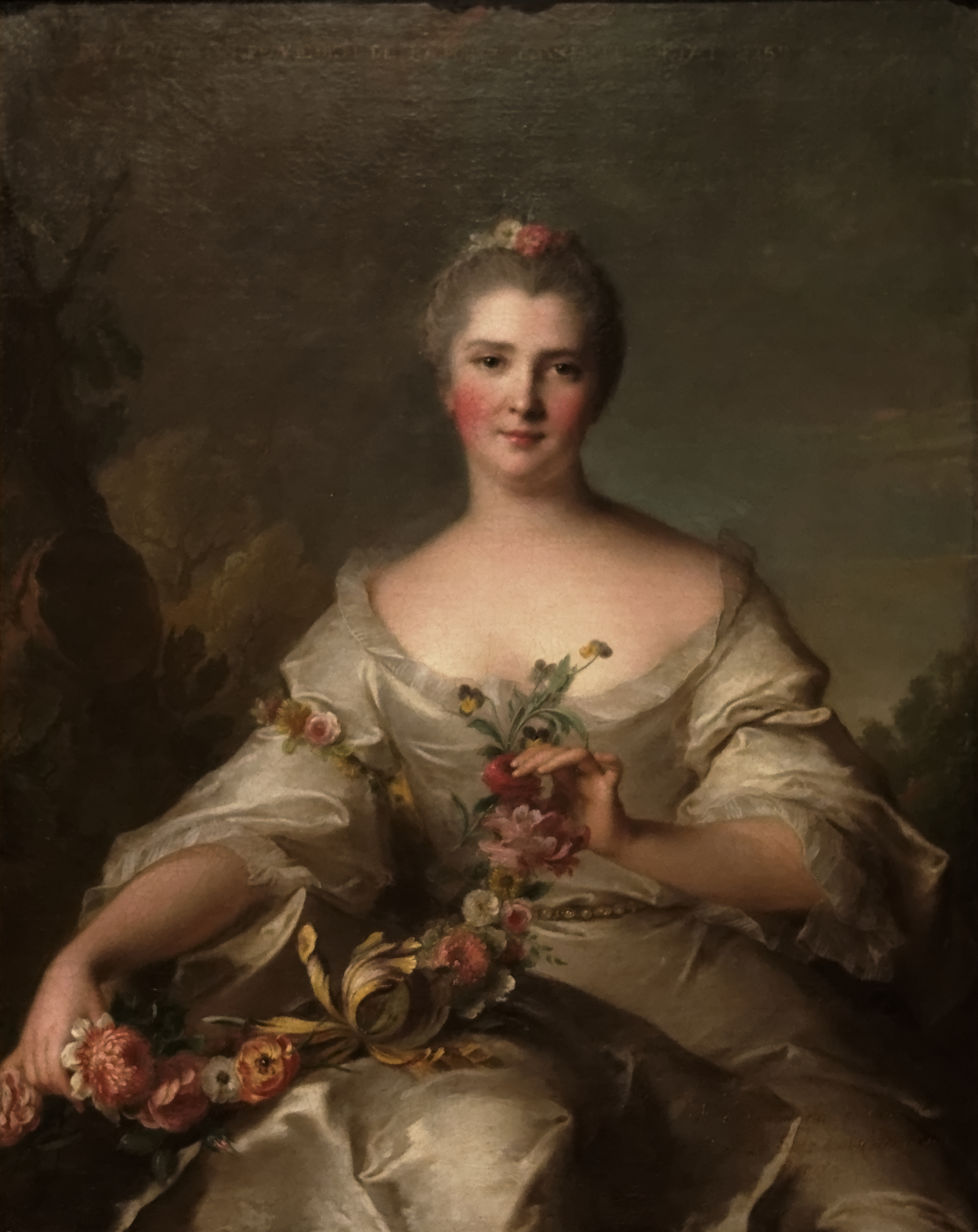
Portrait of Madame de La Porte by Jean-Marc Nattier

== Canada ==
On 17 June 1738, he succeeded Pierre de Forcade as First Commissioner of the Colonial Office. The Intendant of New France (the Civil Governor of Canada), Gilles Hocquart, had travelled back from Quebec to France to plead with the Ministry of the Marine to underwrite the expansion of agriculture and industry there as he judged that there was too little financial capital or expertise available locally. De La Porte, relatively inexperienced, was inclined to trust colonial administrators on matters relating to the areas they governed and so was convinced by Hocquart's arguments. As a result, the Ministry reversed its former policy of austerity and released a half-million livres between 1737 and 1741 for agricultural and industrial development in Canada.

A remarkable economic explosion soon followed, with the Saint-Maurice Forge (the oldest operating steel mill in North America when it finally closed down in 1883), beginning to produce on a larger scale and shipbuilding flowering into an export industry. Canadian local prosperity followed naturally from all this, and the volume of trade increased by 40% in a decade, while exports doubled.

As the king's money flowed in, Hocquart's web of patronage and influence increased apace, much to the detriment of the (military) Governor-General, Charles de la Boische, Marquis de Beauharnois, who saw his own rôle shrinking proportionally. In that day, both in the colonies and in France, the patronage system obtained, which meant that connections with those in a position to grant contracts and allocate resources was everything. Complex webs of support developed around those in power, not always entirely by what we today would judge to be ethical means. This sort of backroom dealing was tolerated by all involved as long as it didn't go “too far” although it seemed that the only way of discovering just how far was too far seemed to be to go there...and get caught.

Beauharnois, increasingly marginalised, decided to remove his rival once and for all and encouraged local magnates to petition the Ministry for a review of his activities. As a result, Arnaud's younger brother Jean de La Porte, sieur de Lalanne was dispatched to Quebec to investigate these rumours of financial irregularities.

The visit of Monsieur de Lalanne, was anticipated with quite a bit of apprehension. Pierre Hazeur de L’Orme, representative of the chapter of Quebec at Paris, informed his brother, Joseph-Thierry Hazeur, at Quebec, of La Porte's mission, adding that everyone in Canada, “important or unimportant,” should pay court to Jean for “he could well one day come to hold a high position.” As Commissaire Enquêteur (Commissioner of the Marine acting as special investigator in Canada) he was empowered to audit all accounts, take depositions from all interested parties, hear complaints and accusations and generally to try to get to the bottom of the scandal, if there was indeed a scandal, for there was already, even before his dispatching, a suspicion that the charges of corruption imputed against Hocquart were in fact fabrications (or at least exaggerations) intended to discredit him, conjured up by his enemy and rival, Governor de Beauharnois.

La Porte arrived at Quebec in the early autumn of 1740, in time to help Hocquart prepare the annual financial dispatches. Hocquart reported that “he has begun to go into much of the routine. I think that he will certainly profit from his time in Canada. He is fortunate to have been born with great natural ability. . .” Whether he accepted Hocquart's advice to visit the Saint-Maurice ironworks that winter is not clear, but he did inspect them on his way to Montreal the following summer. None of his views on the colonial administration has survived, but the very absence of serious repercussions for Canadian officials following his return to France in 1741 suggests that he was reasonably satisfied. Then too, Hocquart, who left nothing to chance, was careful to send him off bathed in praise.

Monsieur de Lalanne's two years in New-France was the first time anyone in the family had set foot in Canada, but he kept an eye out for lucrative colonial enterprises in which he might wish to acquire an interest for himself and his family.

Hocquart's fine opinion of the La Portes soon changed when it became apparent that Jean was using his recently acquired familiarity with the Canadian economy for private benefit. On 17 April 1744, the Count de Maurepas informed Canadian officials that Jean de La Porte was to be given the “fur farm” (la ferme sur la traite des fourrures, i.e. the profits on the taxing of the fur trade) of Lac Alemipigon (Lake Nipigon, Ontario) from that year forward, as a reward for his services in New France. In a letter dated a week later, Maurepas confirmed that the La Porte brothers had also received a warrant granting them five-sixths of the fishery of Baie de Phélypeaux (Baie de Brador, Que.) on the death of the current proprietor, François Martel de Brouage. Revenues from the whole concession had been more than 55,000 livres in 1741.

Both Beauharnois and Hocquart resisted these metropolitan intrusions, asserting that the colonial inhabitants who developed such enterprises should reap their benefits. But Hocquart's successor, François Bigot, proved more cooperative. Arnaud de La Porte became a key figure in the “Grande Société”, acting as Bigot's protector in the office of the colonies. The de La Porte family's fortunes waxed thanks to this, but however frustrating to the locals it might be for distant and powerful officials back in France to be reaping the benefits of their labour, it was entirely in keeping with the usage of the day. The measured exploitation of the financial rewards their situation afforded them was the unspoken norm among high government officials (both in France as in England, cf. the toleration of the contemporaneous Fox there).

No doubt Arnaud in particular had Canadians’ interest sincerely at heart, but Jean's rôle in New-France faded soon after his posting, around 1750, as Commissioner at Saint-Domingue, now Haiti, where the La Portes also had extensive private investments. Arnaud was a vigorous and involved figure at the central government with regard to New France, however as is evidenced by the rich correspondence between him and the Governors and Intendant who followed Hocquart.

Unfortunately, circumstances beyond the good intentions of those on the spot and La Porte in Versailles conspired to bring this initially rewarding boom in Canada to a disappointing end. Incompetent administration of the forge, then three successive years of bad harvests and finally the French declaration of war with England in 1744, which led to naval blockades that annihilated trade until 1748 brought it to an end.

Meanwhile, Arnaud's protégé François Bigot went on to serve as Intendant of New-France during increasingly difficult times for the colony. Pressure was rising from the combined efforts of the British and the Americans to disrupt trade. Inflation was making it harder for the common colonist to survive, let alone prosper, and when the Seven Years' War broke out in 1756, the situation in Canada became chronically critical.

This however did not stop Bigot during his dozen-year intendancy, with a small group of wealthy and powerful locals called the “Grande Compagnie”, from making a profit. By all the usual venal means typical of the Bourbon administration, but brought to a fine art and exploited beyond the usual degree, they continued to line their pockets while still providing a better-than-average administration, especially considering the catastrophic times they faced. Many were the complaints filed against them from the outset, whether from jealous outsiders resentful of being excluded from the “take” or from more legitimate quarters, but the government made not the slightest move to investigate them.

No doubt the powerful La Porte, back home at Versailles, was in on the deal as well, but lest one be too hasty in judging these officials’ probity, it is essential to view the situation within its historical context, not because Bigot was innocent of the accusations brought against him but because the Bourbon administration in general was founded upon venality, patronage, and corruption of just the kind he was accused of (his virtuoso performance aside). It would not be until after the French Revolution that the standards of public honesty we have come to expect would come into being. While Bigot may well have been too greedy even for his day, had New-France not fallen to the British when it did, it is very unlikely he would have ever faced prosecution.

In the event, the British conquest of New France brought an end to all these manoeuvrings and Bigot soon after his return home to France was made to stand trial on corruption charges. Because the government badly needed a scapegoat, and because the enormous costs of the unsuccessful Seven Years' War, among other things, had brought it dangerously near bankruptcy, it was necessary to find him guilty, which the court duly did, simultaneously repudiating as “tainted” the Crown's over 18 million livres of debt to the colonists, many of whom thus found themselves now not only conquered but ruined as well. Known to history as the “Affaire du Canada” this scandal, along with the government's listless reaction to the British conquest, went a long way towards permanently souring relations between the conquered colonists and the French back home. As one of them would later say, they were forced to “remain French despite France”.

Arnaud de La Porte was not implicated in any wrongdoing, and in any case he had, after an immensely successful twenty-year career at the Ministry of the Marine, taken his retirement, on January 27, 1758.

== Patron of science ==
He had, during his long tenure there, also had influence in other spheres as well, in particular in the advancement of science (this was, after all, the Age of Enlightenment). In a letter dated 1742 by the naturalist Georges-Louis Leclerc, Comte de Buffon, 1707-1788, whom Darwin a century later called “the first modern author to treat evolutionary ideas in a scientific spirit”, to a correspondent who had been sending specimens from his posting in Cayenne to Buffon's Jardin du Roi (the modern Jardin des Plantes, Paris), asking for additional funding for his work there, wrote “I have successfully petitioned an augmentation for you of 300 livres for which you are obliged to Monsieur de La Porte whose lively interest in the sciences led him to support your and my claims before Monsieur le Comte de Maurepas...and since he [La Porte] has the direct protection of our Cabinet of Natural History, which is currently very flush and in an enviable state, you would, Monsieur, do well to pay him your court”.

== Accession to the nobility ==
By provisions dated from 18 January, 1764, Arnaud de La Porte was named Maître ordinaire de la Chambre des Comptes (Master Ordinary of the Exchequer) a position which conferred nobility on its bearer as well as upon his descendants. The nobility of the de La Porte family dates from this year. After twelve years of service at the Chambre des Comptes, Arnaud de La Porte died in office on 21 March 1770 at 64 years of age.

== Heirs and family ==
Arnaud de La Porte was survived by two daughters and four sons, and all of the latter entered the public sphere. Arnaud II briefly achieved the position his father had never been able to attain of Minister of the Marine, and during the Revolution was called by his beleaguered king to oversee counterrevolutionary activities from his new post as Intendant of the Civil List (manager of the king's private funds), an endeavour which would cost him his life in 1792 when he became the Revolution's second victim of the guillotine. Jean-Victor took over his father's last position at the Chambre des Comptes and emigrated at the Revolution, serving first in the artillery of the Army of the Princes in Germany, and after its disbanding going into exile in England, living in London for a decade before returning to France during the Napoleonic Regime. Ferdinand was appointed bishop of Carcassonne by Napoleon and was granted the title of Baron by him, and finally Arnaud-Joseph became a Councillor of State under Louis XVIII.

Louis XVIII, on his ascension in 1814, granted the hereditary title of Baron to the son of the guillotined Arnaud Jr. in recognition of the services he had performed for the King during the Revolution, and for his ultimate sacrifice. After the bishop's death, his nephew inherited his Napoleonic baronial title as well as the royal one, thus becoming doubly a baron, but when he died without male heirs both titles passed to Jean-Victor's branch, where they continue to reside to this day.

== Sources ==
- Archives Nationales fond Marine C/7/165 (extraits de la note de Laffilard sur les intendants)
- Horton, Donald J. (1974). "Laporte de Lalanne, Jean de". In Halpenny, Francess G (ed.). Dictionary of Canadian Biography. Vol. III (1741–1770) (online ed.). University of Toronto Press.
- Horton, Donald J. (1979). "Hocquart, Gilles". In Halpenny, Francess G (ed.). Dictionary of Canadian Biography. Vol. IV (1771–1800) (online ed.). University of Toronto Press.
- https://web.archive.org/web/20110720212839/http://www.buffon.cnrs.fr/correspondance/corr_buffon_affi_lettre.php?lang=fr&table=buffon_corr_main&bookId=23&exp=BUFFON&dest=M.%20ARTHUR
