= Eric Laporte (tenor) =

Canadian opera singer

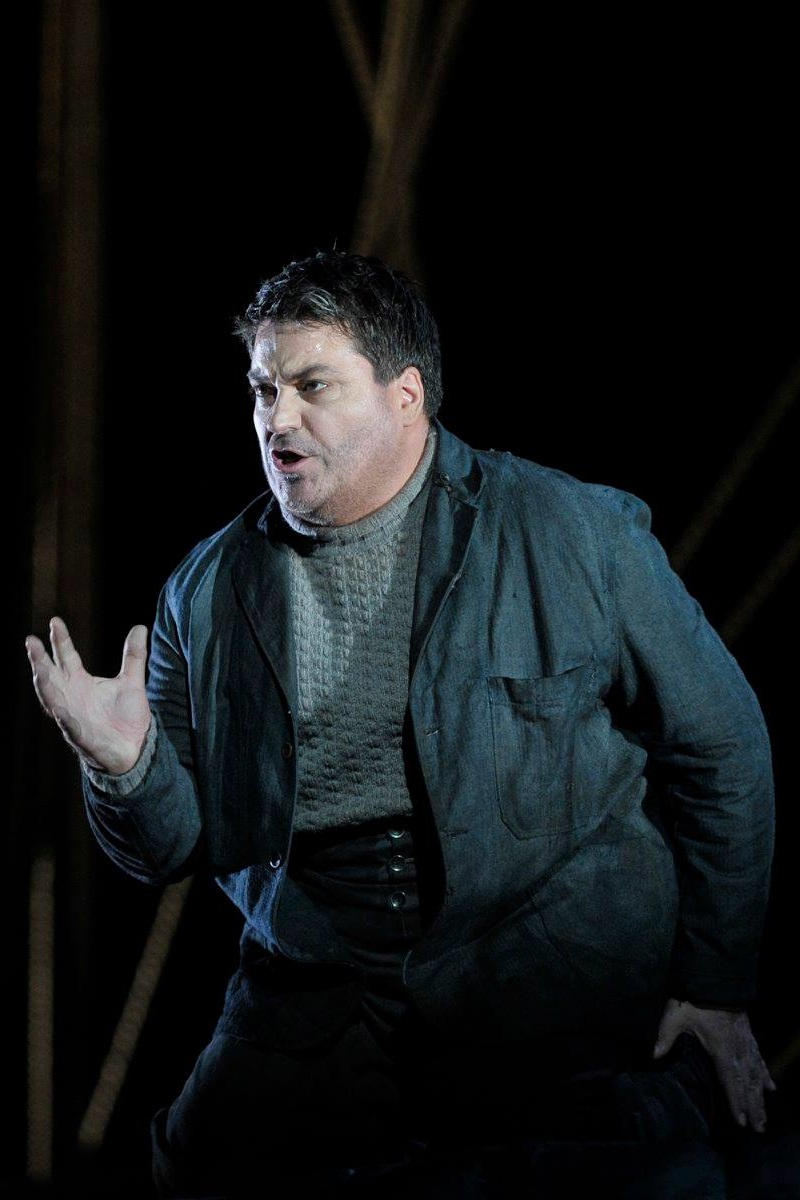
- Laporte in uebec
- Born: Quebec City, Canada
- Occupation: operatic tenor (tenor)
- Years active: 1998–present

Eric Laporte is a tenor from Quebec City in Canada. He has been active on the Canadian and European opera stages, particularly in Germany and Austria, since 1998.

== Education ==
Eric Laporte studied music and singing at Cégep de Sainte-Foy (with Danielle Demers), at the Université du Québec à Montréal (with Joseph Rouleau and Colette Boky) to complete his training with Marie Daveluy as well as at the Atelier lyrique de l'Opéra de Montréal. He says he was inspired to be involved in the performing arts by his aunt Monique Miller and his godmother Louise Rémy, both actresses.

== Beginnings ==
He made his professional debut in 2000 at the Landestheater in Salzburg in Austria, with 25 performances in the role of Tamino from Mozart's The Magic Flute, following his participation in the International Hans Gabor Belvedere Singing Competition in Vienna, in 1999. His career in Europe continued with a three-season engagement at the Landestheater in Linz, followed by two seasons at the Theater Bonn, with respectively nine and six light-lyric first tenor roles.

== Career ==
Eric Laporte has been a freelance artist since 2006, which made him collaborate with many opera houses in Europe, including the Deutsche Oper am Rhein in Düsseldorf, the Cologne Opera, the Bremen Theater, the Reisopera in the Netherlands, the Volksoper in Vienna, the German National Theatre in Weimar, the Opéra Nice Côte d’Azur, the Théâtre du Capitole in Toulouse, the Opéra National du Rhin in Strasbourg, and the Scottish Opera.

Having made his debut as a light-lyric tenor, he was invited in 2012 to perform in the heavier tenor repertoire as Max in Der Freischütz in Gießen, performed again in Hanover in 2015 and 2018. He made his Wagnerian debut with the role of Erik in Der fliegende Holländer in Gießen in 2013, performed again in Hanover in 2017 and in his hometown of Quebec City in 2019.

His major opera engagements include Innsbruck (Nadir in Les Pêcheurs de perles in 2014 and Faust by Gounod in 2015), Maastricht (Alfredo in La traviata in 2014), Mainz (Alfredo in La traviata in 2014, Cavaradossi in Tosca in 2015, Hoffmann in 2019, Des Grieux in Manon Lescaut and Siegmund in Der Ring an einem Abend in 2020), Kaiserslautern (Duca in Rigoletto in 2016 and Nadir in Les Pêcheurs de perles in 2017), Ulm (Calàf in Turandot in 2015, Lohengrin, Werther and Des Grieux in Manon Lescaut in 2016, Radamès in Aïda, Faust by Gounod and Ismaele in Nabucco in 2017), Augsburg (Idomeneo in 2016), Hanover (Max in Der Freischütz in 2015 and 2018, Erik in Der fliegende Holländer in 2017, Faust by Berlioz in 2019, NDR broadcast), Nuremberg (Lohengrin in 2019, BR broadcast), Quebec City (Erik in Der fliegende Holländer in 2019) as well as Frankfurt (Ulysse in Pénélope by Gabriel Fauré in 2019, recorded for Oehms/Naxos).

His concert repertoire includes works such as Beethoven’s 9th Symphony and the oratorio Christus am Ölberge, Berlioz’s La Damnation de Faust, Honegger’s Le Roi David and Igor Kuljerić’s Glagolitic Requiem (recorded for BR-Klassik).

To date (March 2021), Eric Laporte has performed in over 80 productions and 40 opera houses.

== Discography ==
- 2004 : MOZART, W.A.: Mozart chez le Marquis de Sade (Laporte, Piau, Alexiev, Berthon, Mizushima, Shahi-Djanyan, Almanza, Orchestre Provence Alpes Côte d'Azur, dir. Antonello Allemandi (fr)) (Festival de Lacoste 2004, Bel Air)
- 2007 : MASSENET, J.: Thaïs (Fleming, Hampson, Laporte, Cavallier, Vidal, Vienna Radio Symphony Orchestra, dir. Michel Plasson) (ORF)
- 2014 : MARTINŮ, B.: « Mirandolina » from Gießen (Mazzulli, Laporte, Wendt, Cozma, Simon, Intxausti, Fischer, Gießen State Theatre Philharmonic Orchestra, dir. Michael Hofstetter) (House of Opera/HR2 Kultur)
- 2020 : KULJERIĆ, I.: Glagolitic Requiem (Kolar, Schlicht, Laporte, Puškarić, Bavarian Radio Chorus, Munich Radio Orchestra, dir. Ivan Repušić (de) (BR-Klassik)
