= Arnaud II de La Porte =

French politician (1737–1792)

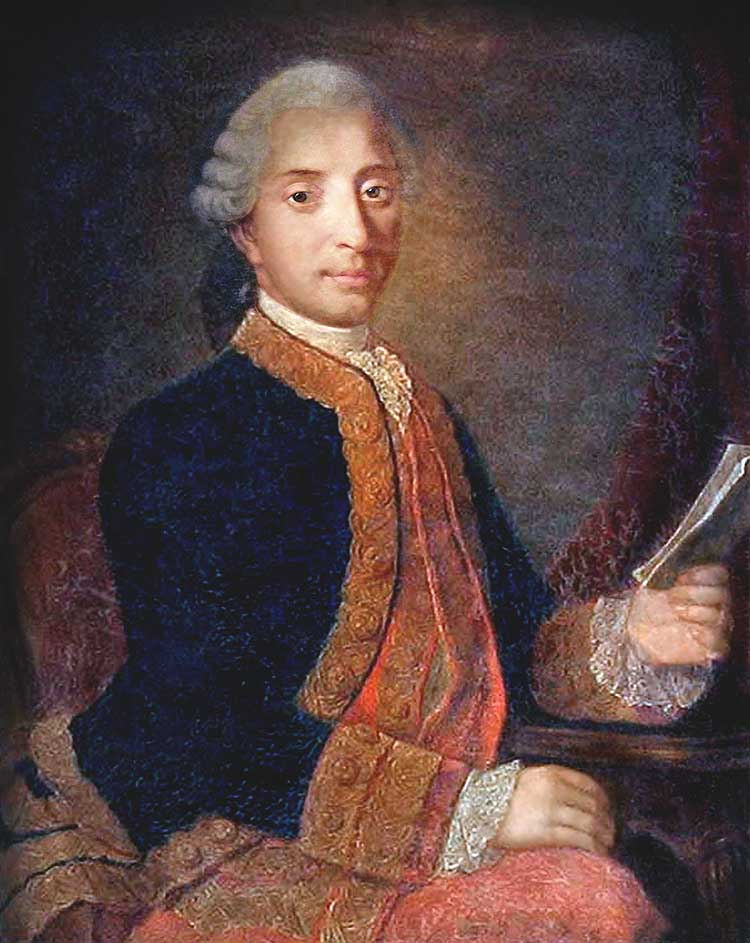
Arnaud II de La Porte

Arnaud II de La Porte (born, Versailles, 14 October 1737; guillotined Paris, 23 August 1792) was a French statesman, Minister of the Marine, Intendant of the King's Civil List (Minister of the Royal Household).

== Early life and career ==
Born at Versailles from a family steeped in the traditions of the palace, de La Porte was destined early to follow in the family footsteps. His great-granduncle was Michel Richard Delalande, court composer to Louis XIV, his grandfather was First Commissary of the Marine Joseph Pellerin, his father Arnaud I de La Porte was First Commissary as well, and his uncle, Joseph Pellerin Jr. was Intendant of the Naval Armies, all under Louis XV and Louis XVI.¹

He began working in his father's bureau in 1755 at only eighteen years of age. The next year he joined his uncle at the Marine (as the Navy was known in France). He would continue in these branches of the government occupying at various times Intendancies of Brest and Bordeaux, arriving at the Intendancy of Foreign and Maritime Trade in 1783.

== The Revolution ==
Named Minister of the Navy during the Baron de Breteuil's ephemeral ministry on 12 July 1789, after the fall of the Bastille two days later, he immediately emigrated to Spain. However Louis XVI needed faithful servants more than ever, and when the King called, La Porte was one of the few who dared answer. He was named Intendant of the Civil List (Minister of the Royal Household) in December 1790 which gave him direct control of the large sums of money that were considered the private wealth of the King and so not subject to public audit. He soon became a close confidant of the beleaguered king and Louis XVI entrusted him with great sums of this private money to be distributed toward the moderation of the rapidly radicalising revolutionary fervour. More than 1500 persons; actors, singers, public speakers, etc. were employed to this end, at an expense which exceeded 200,000 livres monthly. In 1791 La Porte founded the "National" Club in the Carrousel. Despite his close collaboration with Mirabeau, and especially due to the latter's premature death, La Porte's efforts proved to be in vain.

Seeing how dangerous things were becoming, La Porte, who conferred on a daily basis with the King in his apartments in the Pavillon de l'Infante of the Louvre (which were attached by a long wing to the Tuileries Palace at that time), proposed a plan to his sovereign in an attempt to save his life. He had previously discovered a secret room in his suite, and knowing that the guards would not take notice of his passage since he made the same walk every day, counselled the King to hide in the secret room after their daily conference until such a time as he could be safely spirited out of the whole palace complex. At that time Louis refused, still certain of the love of his people. The Queen's friend, Fersen would be more successful in convincing him of his need to escape a few months later. When the royal family attempted the flight to Varennes, La Porte was left behind, entrusted by the King to read his letter explaining his motives to the Constituent Assembly, something that must have been a thankless, not to say extremely dangerous task.

Caught near the border, the royal family was unceremoniously returned to Paris to face the music. The King's position deteriorated steadily after that. After the storming of the Tuileries on 10 August, La Porte was arrested for having distributed secret funds, and convicted of treason against the Revolution becoming, on 23 August 1792, the second political victim of that new humane device: the guillotine. In a macabre gesture, his severed head was then presented to the King, by then imprisoned in the Temple, as a grisly birthday gift.

His services and ultimate sacrifice were recalled after the Restoration by the King's younger brother who had been crowned as Louis XVIII, and his son Arnaud III de La Porte was created a baron in recognition of all this in 1822. The title remains in the family to this day.
