= Château de Fonscolombe =

Coordinates: 43.639°N 5.468°E

- Interactive map of the Château de Fonscolombe area

General information
- Type: Château
- Location: 3301 Route de Saint-Canadet, Le Puy-Sainte-Réparade, France
- Completed: 1720
- Owner: Mrs de Saporta

The Château de Fonscolombe is a château, vineyard and winery in Le Puy-Sainte-Réparade.

== Location ==
It is located at 3301 Route de Saint-Canadet in Le Puy-Sainte-Réparade, a village 15 km away from Aix-en-Provence.

== History ==
The castle was built for Honoré Boyer de Fonscolombe (1683-1743) in 1720. It is surrounded by a garden with sculptures by Jean-Pancrace Chastel (1726-1793).

It has been listed as a monument historique since 1989. Its current owner is Mrs de Saporta (a descendant of Gaston de Saporta). Additionally, the sculptures in the garden and the chapel were listed in 1994. It is open to the public every weekday from 9am to 12pm, and from 2pm to 6pm. It is also open on Saturdays from 9:30am to 12pm, and from 2:30pm to 6pm.

== Vineyard ==
It spans 70 hectares of vineyards, and produces red, rosé and white wines.
