= Honoré Boyer de Fonscolombe =

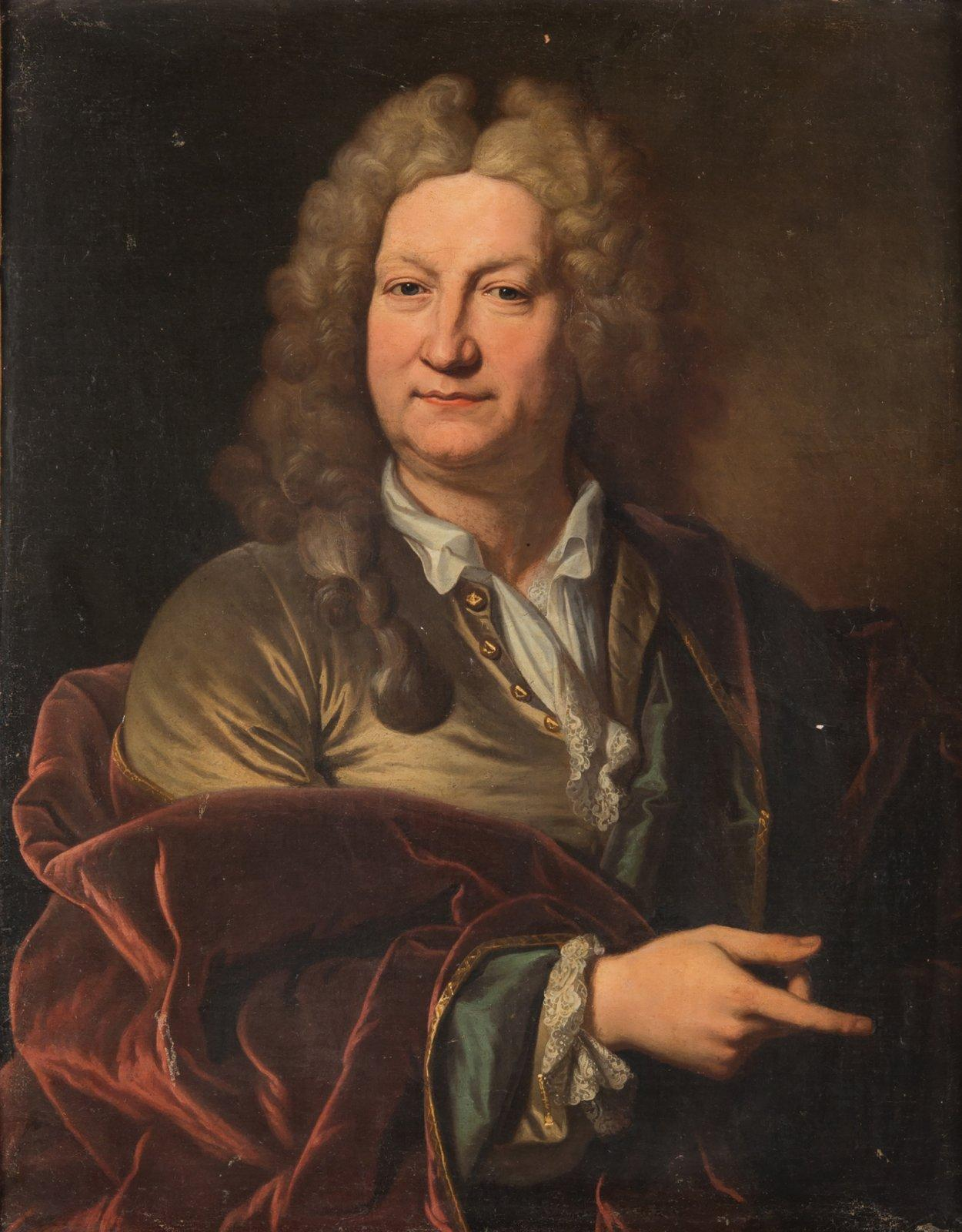
- Born: 1683
- Died: 1743 (aged 59–60)
- Monuments: Château de Fonscolombe, Le Puy-Sainte-Réparade, France; Hôtel Boyer de Fonscolombe, Aix-en-Provence, France
- Occupations: Seller of goods Lawyer

Honoré Boyer de Fonscolombe (1683–1743) was a French aristocrat, merchant, lawyer and public official.

== Biography ==
=== Early life ===
Honoré Boyer de Fonscolombe was born in 1683. His father, Denis Boyer, was a Consul in the Parlement of Aix-en-Provence.

=== Career ===
He made his fortune by selling furniture and silk in Aix-en-Provence.

He became a prosecutor in the Parlement of Aix-en-Provence in 1726. He was appointed Secretary to King Louis XV (1710–1774) on 11 November 1741. As a result of this appointment, he earned the marquisate of Fonscolombe (inherited by all his direct male heirs).

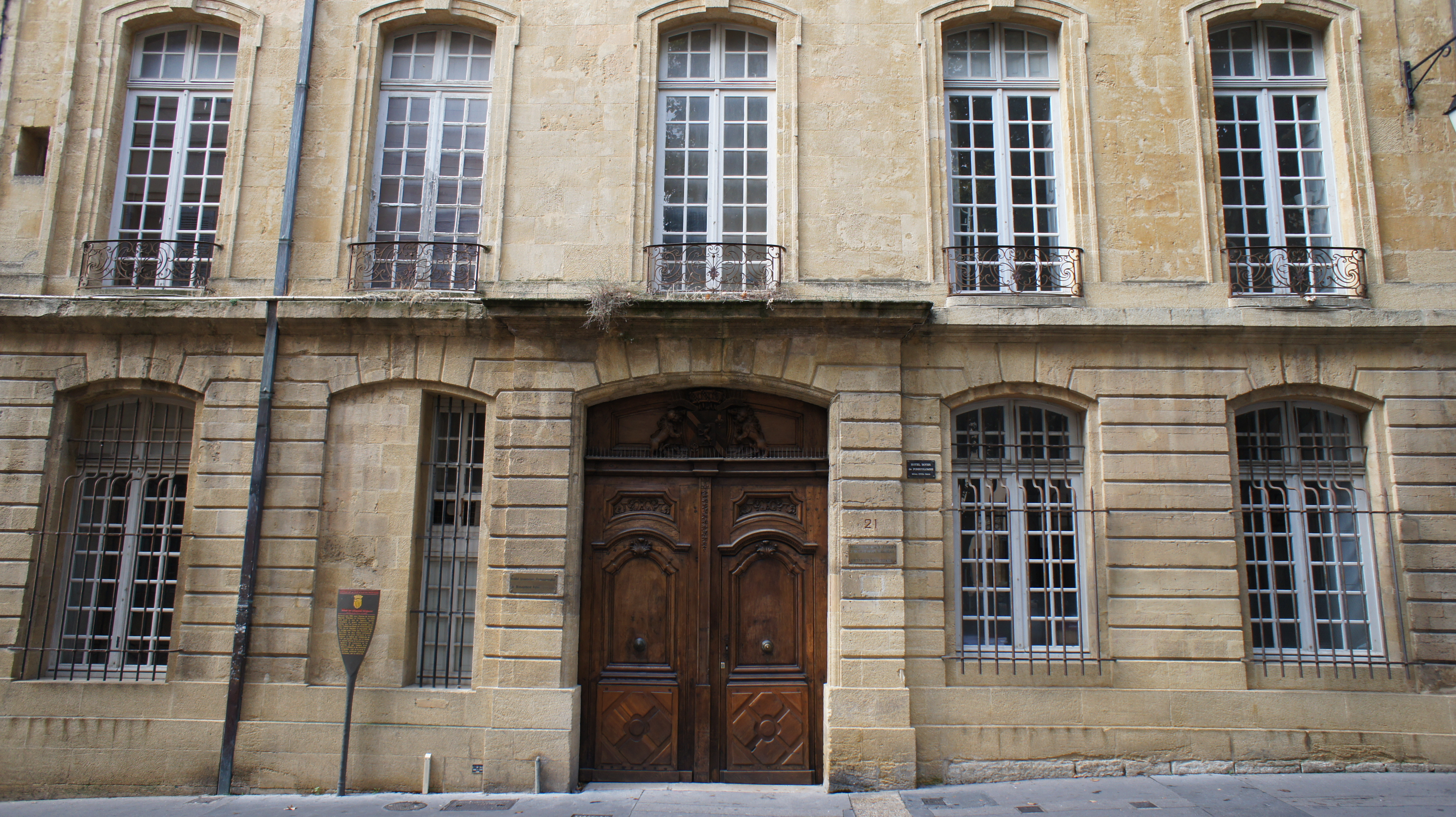
Hôtel Boyer de Fonscolombe in Aix-en-Provence

=== Personal life ===
He was married to Jeanne Carnaud. They had five sons and five daughters:

- Jean-Baptiste-Laurent Boyer de Fonscolombe.
- Luc Boyer de Fonscolombe.
- Jean-Baptiste Boyer de Fonscolombe.
- Joseph Boyer de Fonscolombe.
- Antoine Boyer de Fonscolombe.

In 1720, he commissioned the Château de Fonscolombe in Le Puy-Sainte-Réparade, listed as a monument historique since 1989. In 1743 (shortly before his death), he also inherited the Hôtel Boyer de Fonscolombe on the Rue de Gaston de Saporta in Aix from his late sister, listed as a monument historique since 1989.

He died in 1743. Étienne Laurent Joseph Hippolyte Boyer de Fonscolombe (1772–1853) and Emmanuel de Fonscolombe (1810–1875) were two of his descendants.
