= Saporta =

Saporta (Catalan: Ça Porta) is a surname. Notable people with the surname include:

- Antoine de Saporta (1855–1914), French aristocrat and non-fiction writer
- Bonastruc ça Porta (1194–1270), Catalan, leading Jewish rabbi, scholar and doctor, also known as Moses ben Nachman, and Nachmonides, and the Ramban.
- Gabe Saporta (born 1979), Uruguayan American musician and entrepreneur
- Gaston de Saporta (1823–1895), French aristocrat, palaeobotanist and non-fiction writer
- Ishak Saporta (born 1957), management researcher in Tel Aviv University and social-democrat activist
- Karine Saporta (born 1950), French choreographer, dancer, photographer and short film director
- Raimundo Saporta (1926–1997), Spanish basketball administrator
