= Emmanuel Boyer de Fonscolombe =

French aristocrat and composer

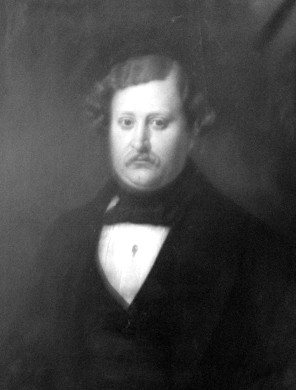
- Born: 27 October 1810; Aix-en-Provence, Bouches-du-Rhône, Provence-Alpes-Côte d'Azur, France
- Died: 21 March 1875 (aged 64); Aix-en-Provence, Bouches-du-Rhône, Provence-Alpes-Côte d'Azur, France
- Occupation: Composer
- Children: Charles Henri Boyer de Fonscolombe; Fernand Hippolyte Boyer de Fonscolombe
- Parent(s): Charles Boyer de Fonscolombe; Emilie de Cotto

Emmanuel Boyer de Fonscolombe (1810–1875) was a French aristocrat and composer.

== Biography ==
=== Early life ===
Emmanuel Boyer de Fonscolombe was born on 27 October 1810 in Aix-en-Provence. The Boyer de Fonscolombe family became an aristocratic family with his paternal great-great-grandfather Honoré Boyer de Fonscolombe (1683–1743), who served as Secretary to King Louis XV (1710–1774). His father was Charles Boyer de Fonscolombe (1778–1838) and his mother, Emilie de Cotto (1790-unknown). He had two brothers, Philippe and Ludovic. Gabriel-Barthélemy de Magneval (1751–1821) was his grandfather.

=== Career ===
He was trained as a lawyer, and was an amateur entomologist and botanist.

He became a renowned music composer. He wrote an opera, Un Prisonnier en Crimée. He also composed motets, melodies for Roman Catholic Masses, etc. He served as a chapel master in the Église de la Madeleine in Aix. He was friends with composer Félicien David (1810–1876), who honoured him with two of his songs: "Eden and Moïse au Sinaï.

He was made a hereditary Baron by Emperor Napoleon III (1808–1873) on 1 August 1864.

=== Personal life ===
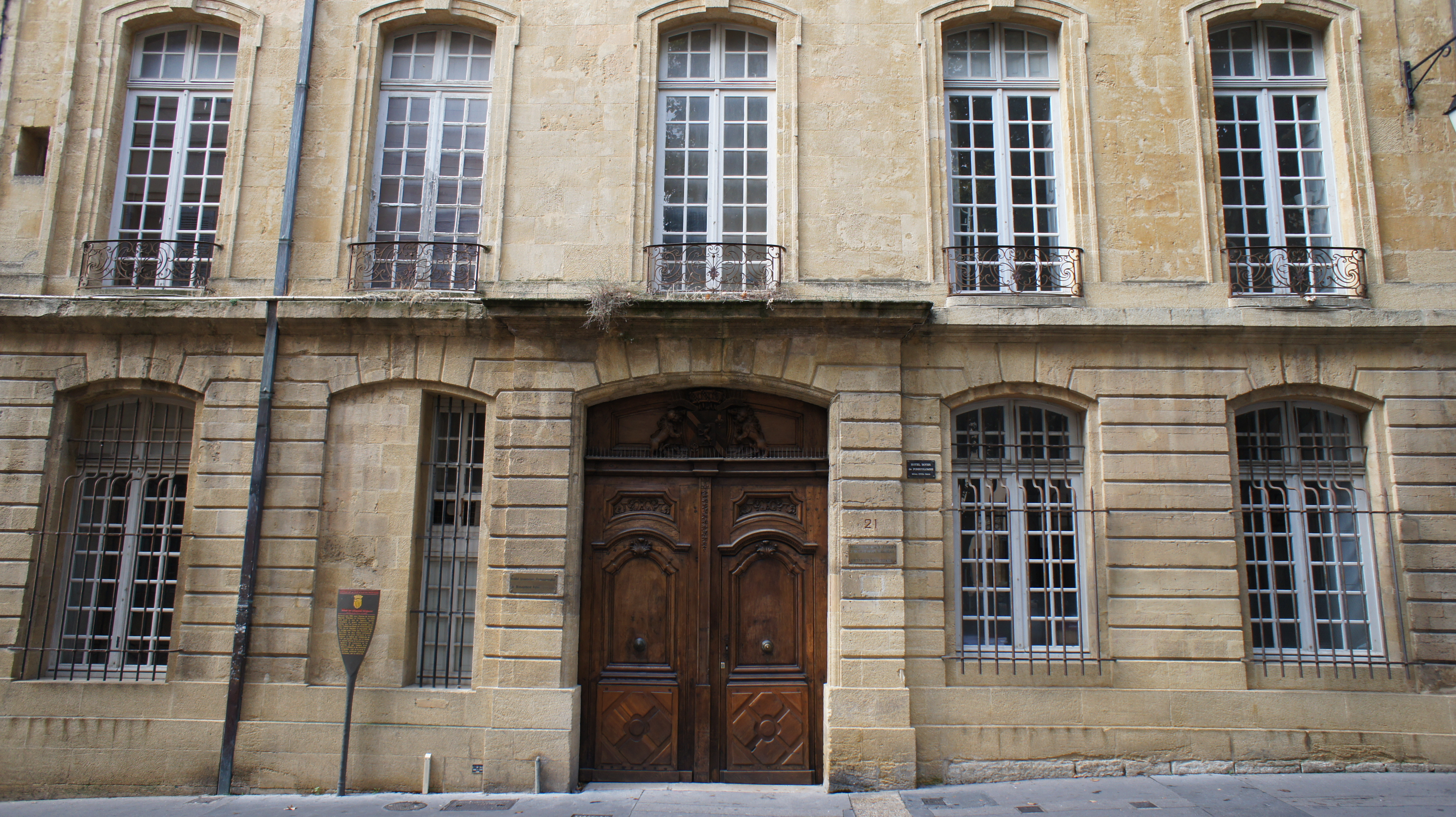
Hôtel Boyer de Fonscolombe in Aix-en-Provence

He was married to Anne Salavy, daughter of Jacques-Henri Salavy and granddaughter of politician Jean-Honoré Salavy (1749–1823). They had two sons:

- Charles Henri Boyer de Fonscolombe (1838–1907). He married Alice de Romanet de Lestrange (1847–1933), daughter of Théodore de Romanet de Lestrange (1823–1900) and Caroline de Lestrange (1824–1905). They had a son and a daughter:
  - Emmanuel Boyer de Fonscolombe de la Môle (1874-unknown). He married Yvonne Gavoty (1883–1965), daughter of Charles Gavoty (1843–1930) and Delphine Jacques (1856–1928). They had a daughter and a son:
    - Sabine Boyer (1910–2004). She married Bernard Guillaume de Sauville de la Presle (1907–2008).
    - Charles Boyer de Fonscolombe de la Môle (born 1912).
  - Marie Boyer de Fonscolombe de la Môle (1875–1972). She married Jean Marc Martin de Saint-Exupéry (1863–1904), the son of Jean Louis Fernand de Saint-Exupéry (1833–1919) and Alix Elisabeth Blouquier de Trélan (1843–1906). They had five children:
    - Magdeleine de Saint-Exupéry (1897–1926).
    - Simone de Saint-Exupéry (1898–1978).
    - Antoine de Saint-Exupéry (1900–1944). He was an aviator and the author of The Little Prince.
    - François de Saint-Exupéry (1902–1917).
    - Gabrielle de Saint-Exupéry (1903–1986).
- Fernand Hippolyte Boyer de Fonscolombe (1841-unknown).

He resided with his family in the Château de La Môle, a castle in La Môle belonging to the Boyer de Fonscolombe family since 1770. They also lived in a family hôtel particulier in Aix-en-Provence: the Hôtel Boyer de Fonscolombe, now listed as a monument historique, located at 21 rue Gaston de Saporta.

He died on 21 March 1875 in Aix-en-Provence.
