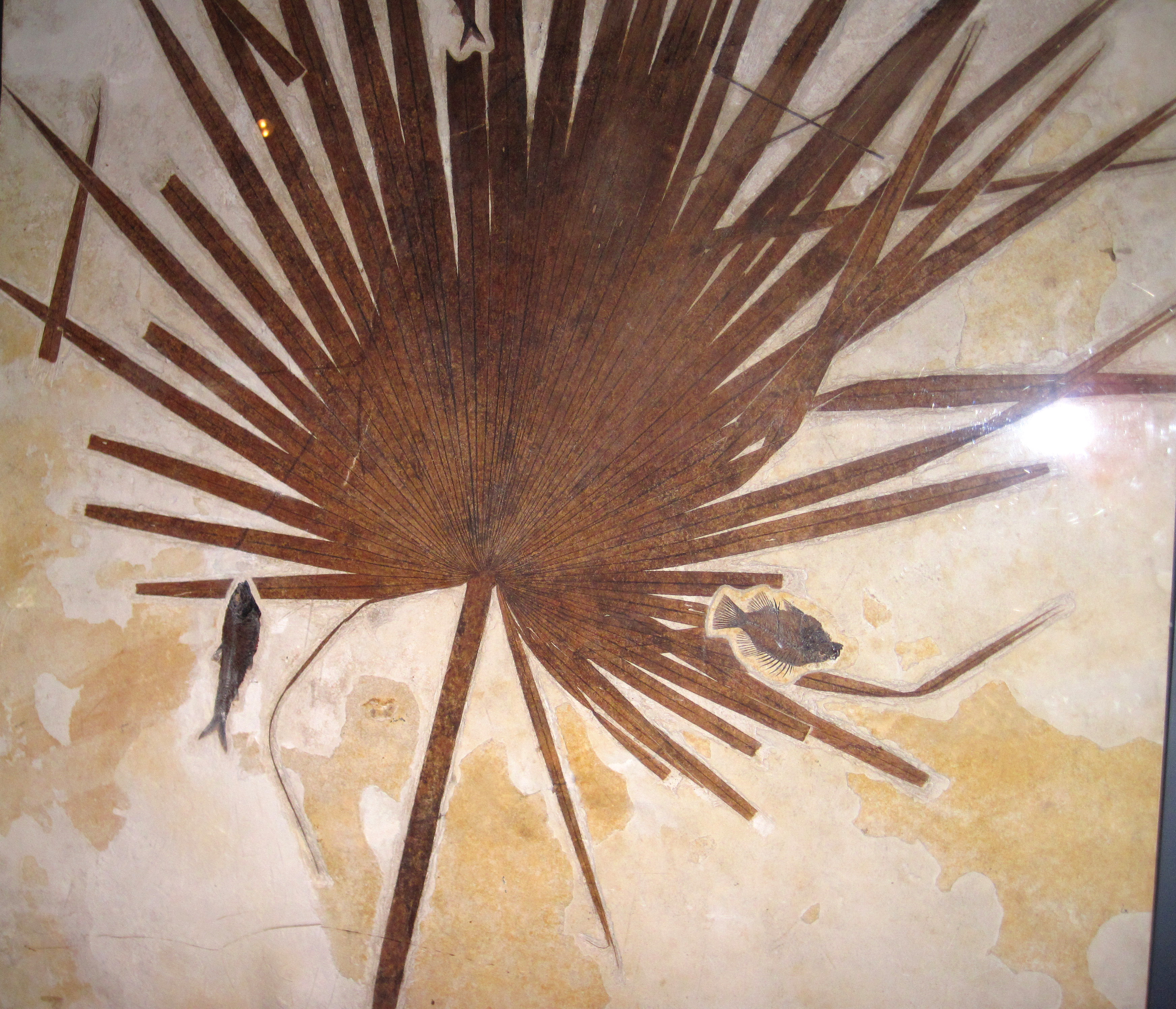
- Sabalites powelli palm frond and fossil fish in marlstone from the Eocene of Wyoming, US

Scientific classification
- Kingdom: Plantae
- Clade: Tracheophytes
- Clade: Angiosperms
- Clade: Monocots
- Clade: Commelinids
- Order: Arecales
- Family: Arecaceae
- Subfamily: Coryphoideae
- Genus: †Sabalites; Saporta 1865

= Sabalites =

Sabalites Temporal range: late Cretaceous to Miocene ~71–16 Ma

Extinct genus of palm

Sabalites is an extinct genus of palm. Species belonging to the genus lived in the late Cretaceous to Miocene and have been found in South America, North America, Europe, and Asia. The genus is characterized by its costapalmate leaves, which consist of a radial fan of leaves that have individual pronounced midribs (costa).

The genus was erected by Gaston de Saporta, who rejected Oswald Heer's previous placement of the relevant fossil species in the genus Sabal.

== Species ==
A number of species have been described in Sabalites.

S. californicus
S. grayana
S. montana
S. oxyrhachis
S. powellii
S. siwalicus
S. longirhachis
S. suessionensis

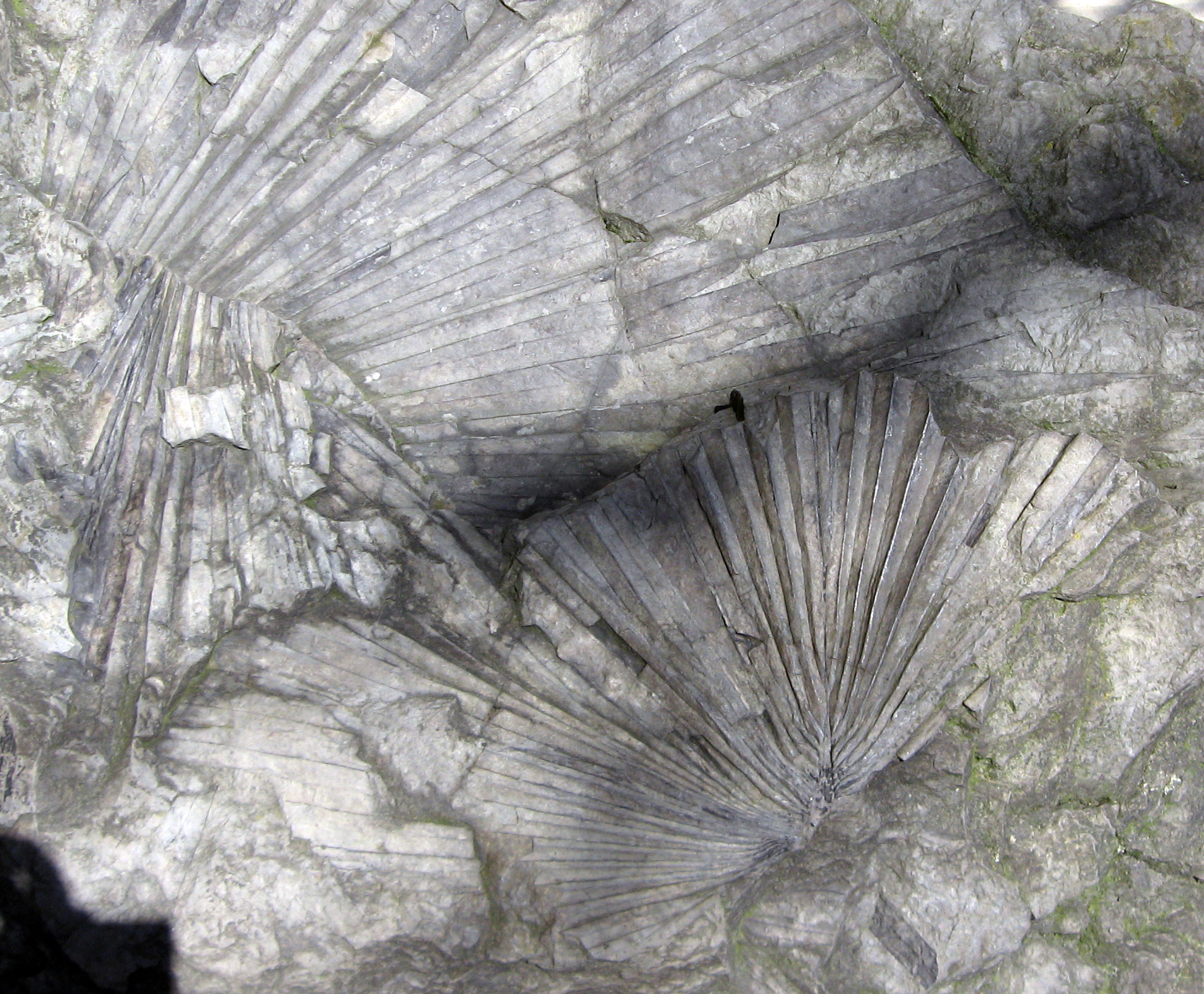

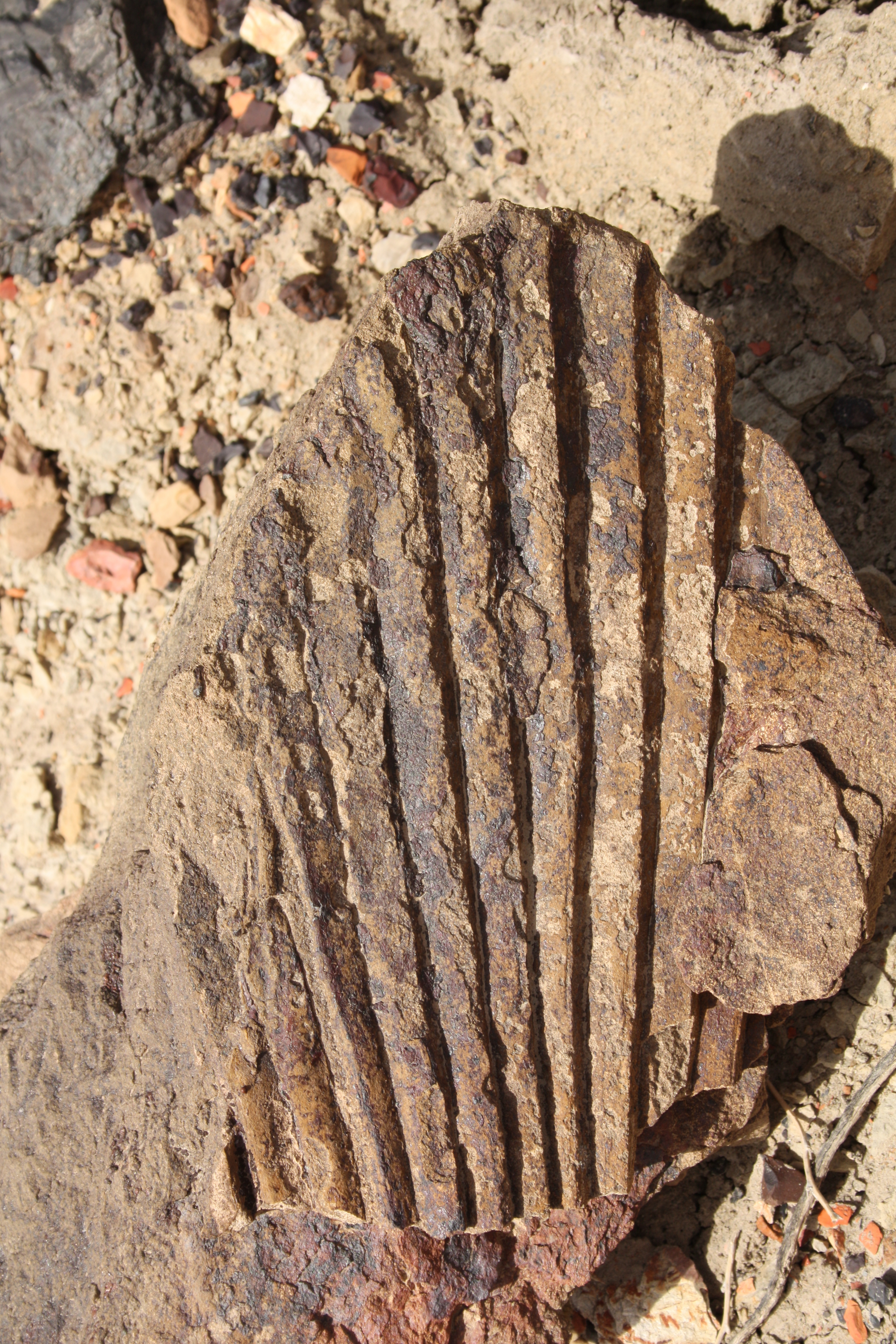
These ripple-marks are Sabalites californicus.

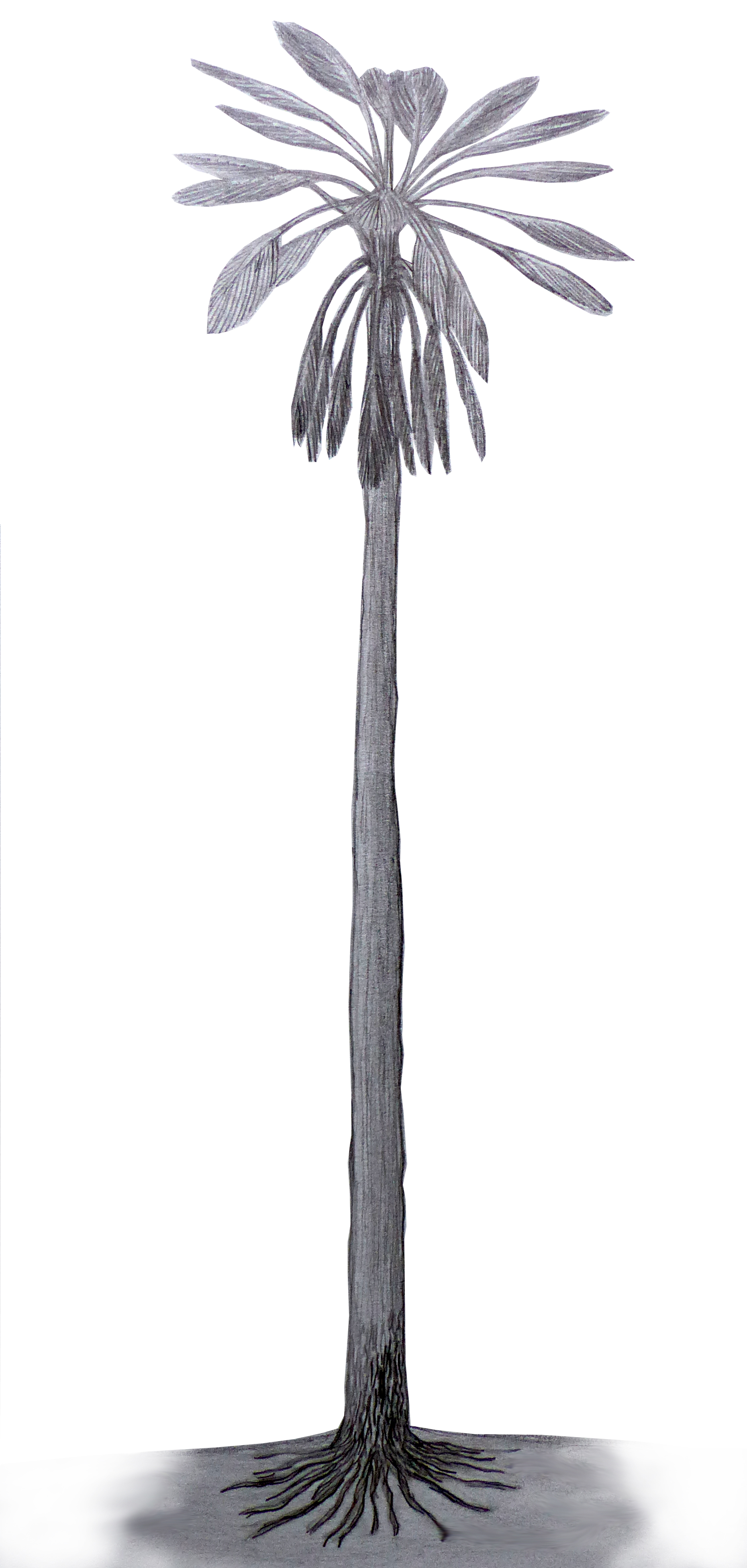
