= Jean-Honoré Salavy =

French businessman and politician

- Born: September 16, 1749; Montpellier, Hérault, Languedoc-Roussillon, France
- Died: May 5, 1823 (aged 73); Montpellier, Hérault, Languedoc-Roussillon, France
- Occupations: Businessman politician
- Spouse: Julie Martin

Jean-Honoré Salavy (1749–1823) was a French businessman and politician.

== Biography ==
=== Early life ===
Jean-Honoré Salavy was born on September 16, 1749, in Montpellier.

=== Career ===
He worked as a businessman in Marseille. He later worked with the firms "Solier, Salavy, Martin et Cie" and later with Salavy, Martin et Cie", alongside his father-in-law. He was a member of the Chamber of Commerce of Marseille.

He served on the city council of Marseille and the general council of Bouches-du-Rhône. He served as a member of the National Assembly from May 17, 1815, to July 13, 1815, during the Hundred Days.

=== Personal life ===
He was married to Julie Martin. They resided at 21 rue de l'Armeny in Marseille. They had three sons:

- Pierre-François-Antoine Salavy.
- Joseph-Henri Salavy.
- Jacques-Henri Salavy. They had a daughter:
  - Anne Salavy. She married composer Emmanuel de Fonscolombe (1810–1875).

He died on May 5, 1823, in Montpellier.
