= Hôtel de Grimaldi-Régusse =

Coordinates: 43.5273°N 5.4541°E

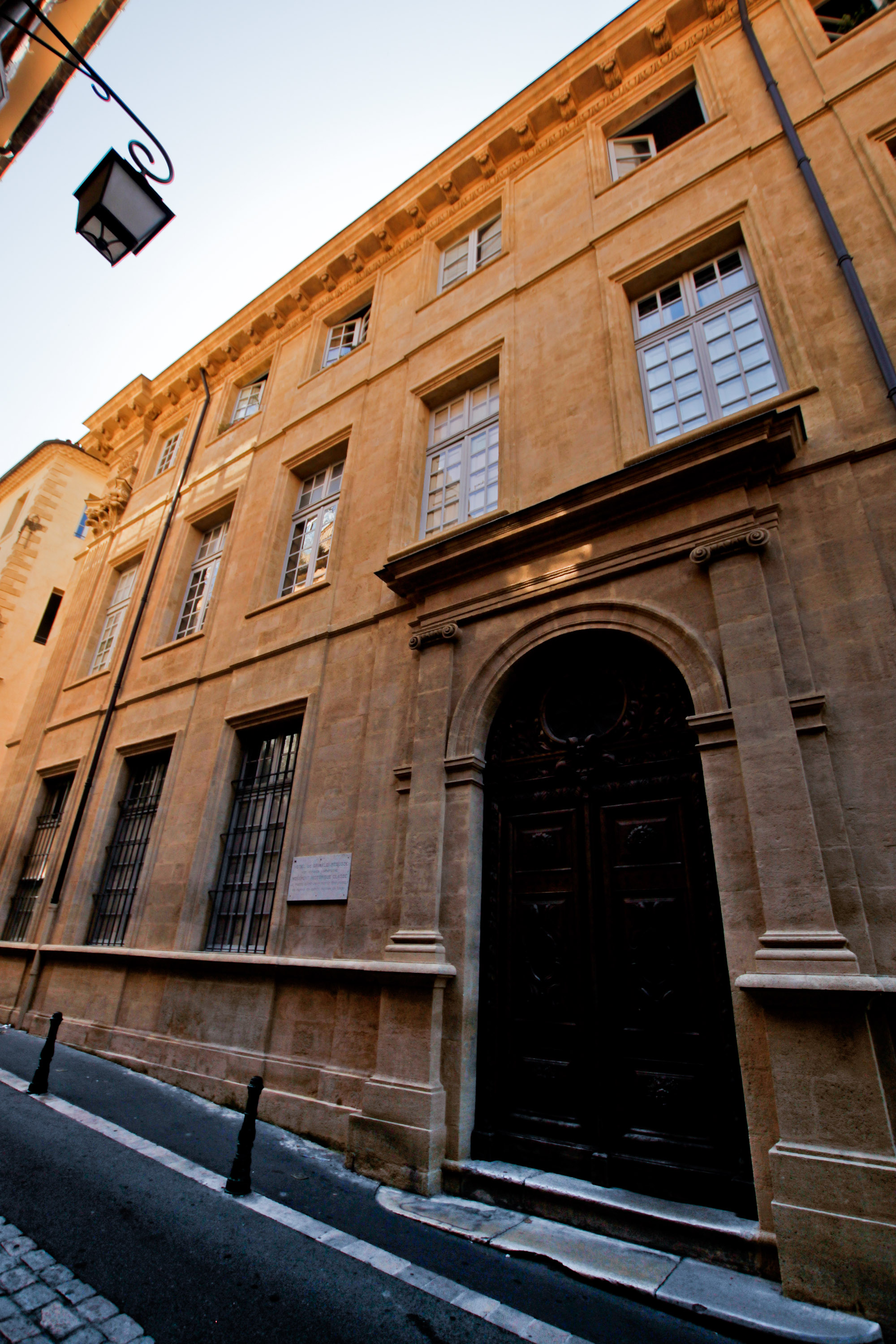
- Interactive map of the Hôtel de Grimaldi-Régusse area

General information
- Type: Hôtel particulier
- Location: 26, rue de l'Opéra, Aix-en-Provence, France
- Completed: 1680
- Client: Charles de Grimaldi-Régusse

Design and construction
- Architects: Pierre Puget; Thomas Veyrier

The Hôtel de Grimaldi-Régusse is a listed hôtel particulier in the Aix-en-Provence of France.

== Location ==
It is located at 26, rue de l'Opéra in Aix-en-Provence, in the Villeneuve quarter.

== History ==
It was designed by architects Pierre Puget (1620–1694) and Thomas Veyrier for Charles de Grimaldi-Régusse (1612–1687) in 1680. The facade was designed by architect Laurent Vallon (1652–1724). The ceiling in a drawing-room was painted by Sébastien Barras (1653–1703). The main door is sculpted with designs of lions surrounded by foliage.

== Heritage significance ==
It has been listed as a monument historique since 21 February 1973.
