= Hôtel Boyer de Fonscolombe =

Coordinates: 43.5314°N 5.4471°E

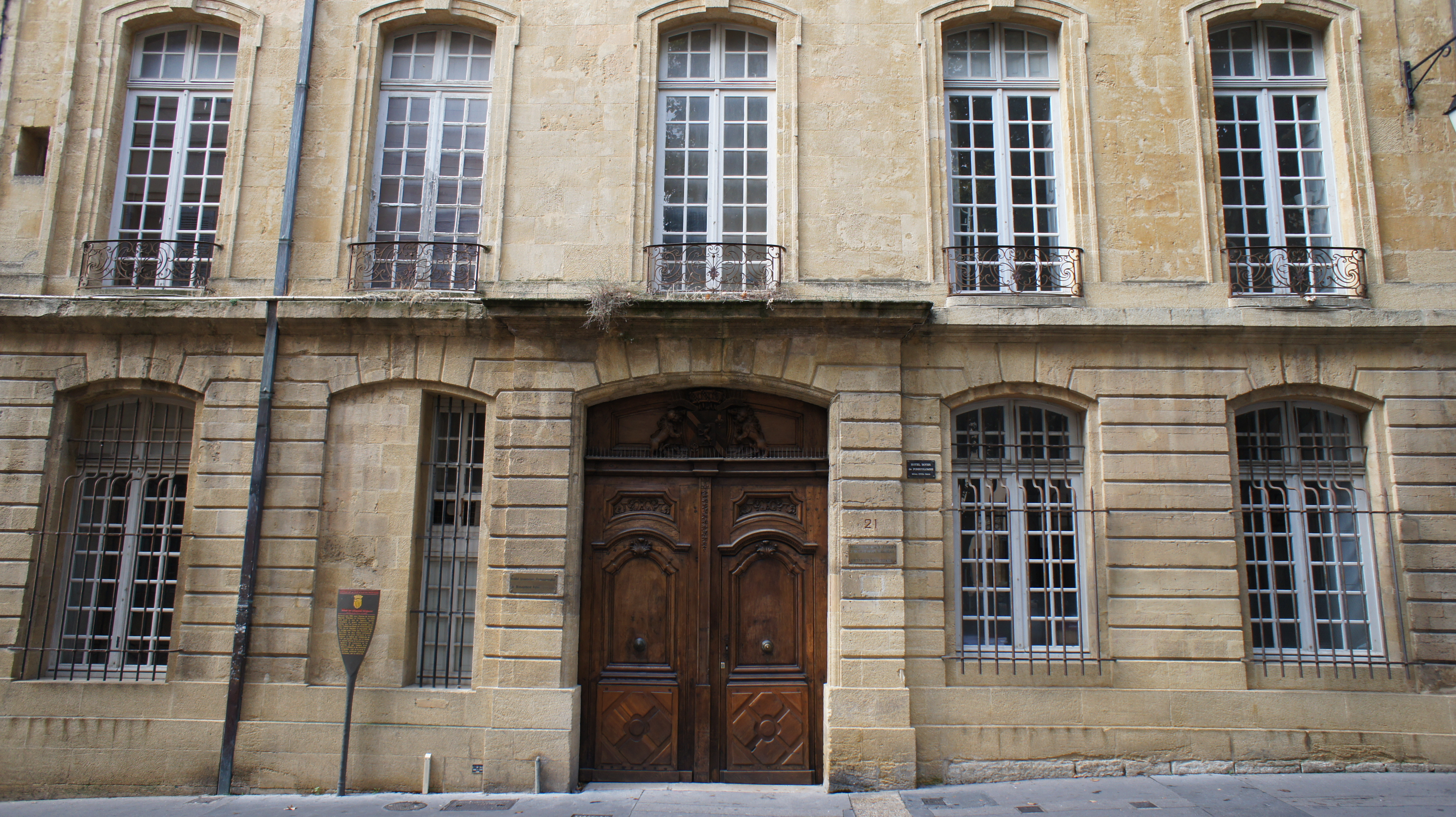
- Interactive map of the Hôtel Boyer de Fonscolombe area

General information
- Type: Hôtel particulier
- Location: 21, Rue Gaston de Saporta, Aix-en-Provence, France
- Current tenants: Aix-Marseille University
- Owner: French state

The Hôtel Boyer de Fonscolombe is a listed hôtel particulier in Aix-en-Provence. It houses the Institut de Management Public et Gouvernance Territoriale of Aix-Marseille University.

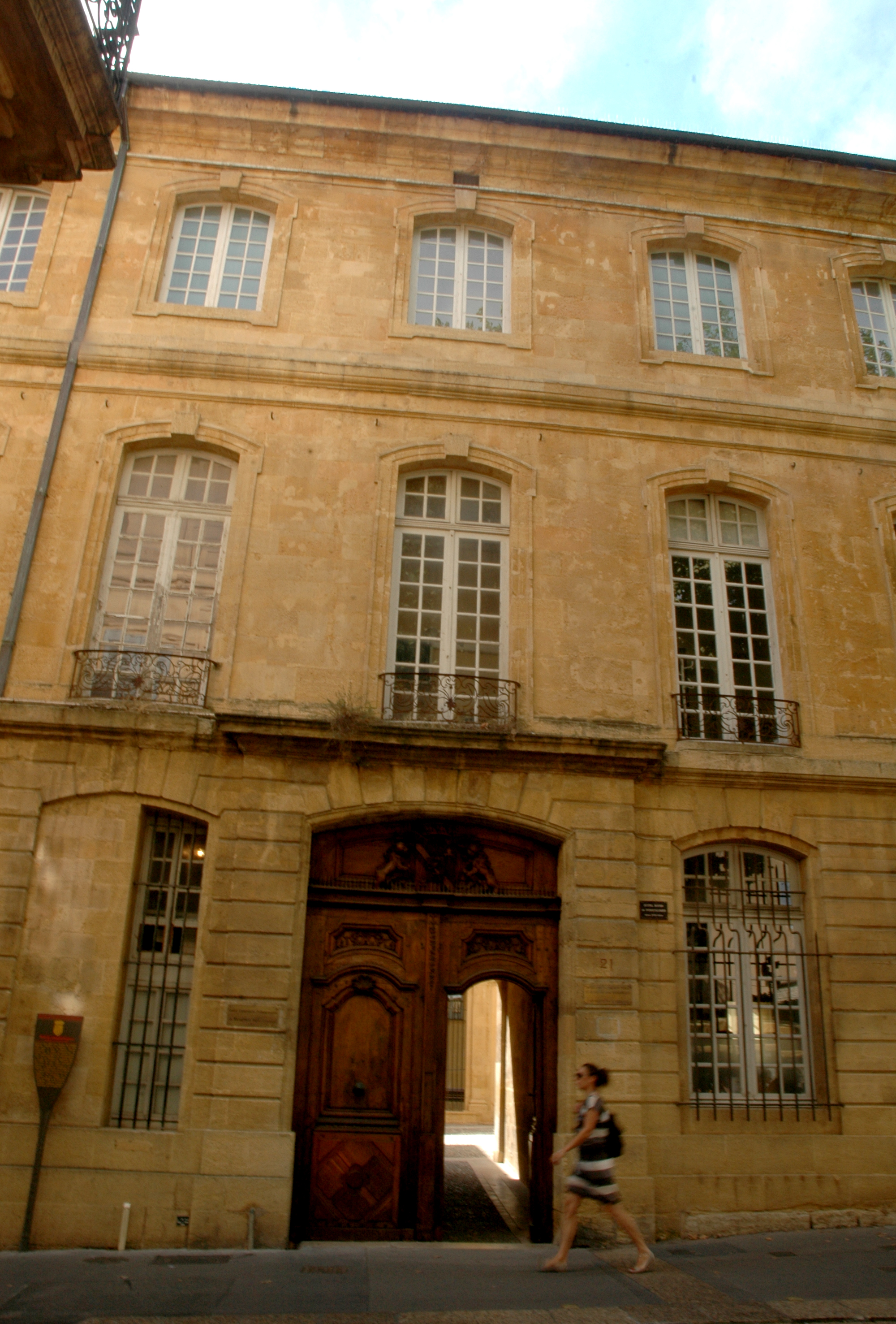
Hôtel Boyer de Fonscolombe

== Location ==
It is located 21, Rue Gaston de Saporta (formerly known as the rue de la Grande Horloge) in Aix-en-Provence.

== History ==
It was built as two separate houses for the Roman Catholic archbishopry, as it is next door to the Cathédrale Saint-Sauveur.

In the sixteenth century, it was purchased by two families: a baker, and the de Rascas family. In 1635 and in 1642, Charles de Grimaldi-Régusse (1612–1687) purchased the two townhouses and merged them into one. (He also lived in the Hôtel de Grimaldi-Régusse, another hôtel particulier located at 26, rue de l'Opéra in Aix.) In the eighteenth century, his descendants sold the hotel to the Forbin La Barben family.

In 1743 (shortly before his death), Honoré Boyer de Fonscolombe (1683–1743) inherited it from his sister. His son Léon-Baptiste-Laurent de Fonscolombe inherited it and restored it. For example, in 1757 he restored the facade. In 1821, the parents of Gaston de Saporta (1823–1895) inherited it, and he grew up there, as did his son, writer Antoine de Saporta (1855–1914). Later, the de Saporta family sold it to the de Vitrolles family, who rented it.

It was purchased by the French state in 1950, and it was assigned to the Ministry of National Education in 1955. It has been used by Aix-Marseille University since 1965.

Inside it has paintings ceilings and gypseries. It also displays paintings by Nicolas Pinson (1636–1681) and Esprit Antoine Gibelin (1739–1813).

== Heritage significance ==
It has been listed as a monument historique since 1989.
