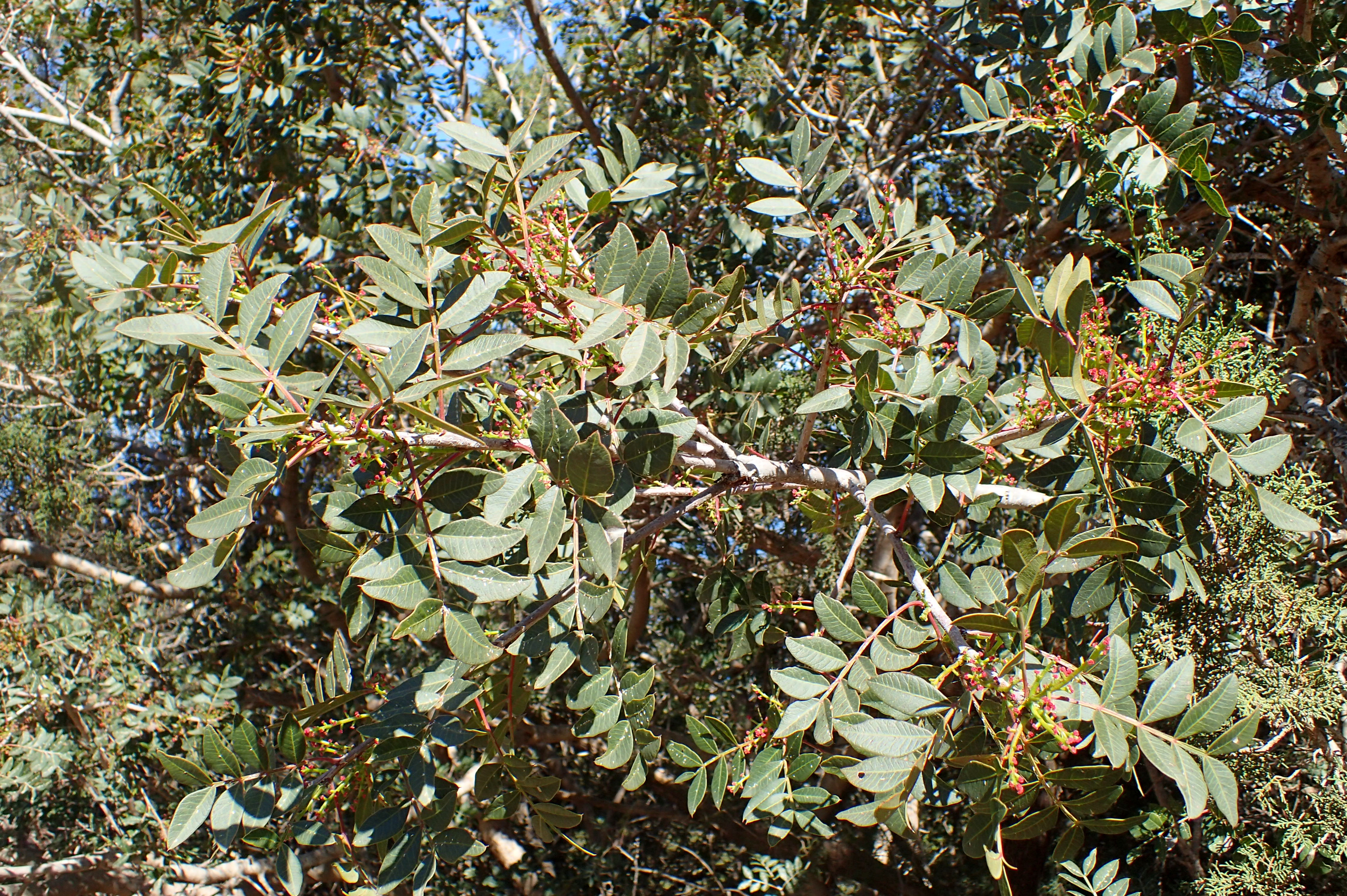

Scientific classification
- Kingdom: Plantae
- Clade: Embryophytes
- Clade: Tracheophytes
- Clade: Spermatophytes
- Clade: Angiosperms
- Clade: Eudicots
- Clade: Rosids
- Order: Sapindales
- Family: Anacardiaceae
- Genus: Pistacia
- Species: P. saportae

Binomial name
- Pistacia saportae Burnat

Synonyms
- Pistacia lentiscus × terebinthus

= Pistacia × saportae =

Species of plant

Pistacia saportae is a species of tree in the family Anacardiaceae growing in the Mediterranean zone. It has been named in honour of Gaston de Saporta.
