= Charles de Grimaldi-Régusse =

French aristocrat, landowner and politician

- Born: August 10, 1612
- Died: July 23, 1664 (aged 51)
- Occupations: Landowner, politician
- Criminal charges: Murder x3
- Criminal penalty: Death penalty
- Criminal status: Executed by being burned at a stake
- Parent(s): Pierre de Grimaldi; Louise de Laydet

Charles de Grimaldi-Régusse (August 10, 1612 – July 23, 1664) was a French aristocrat, landowner and politician.

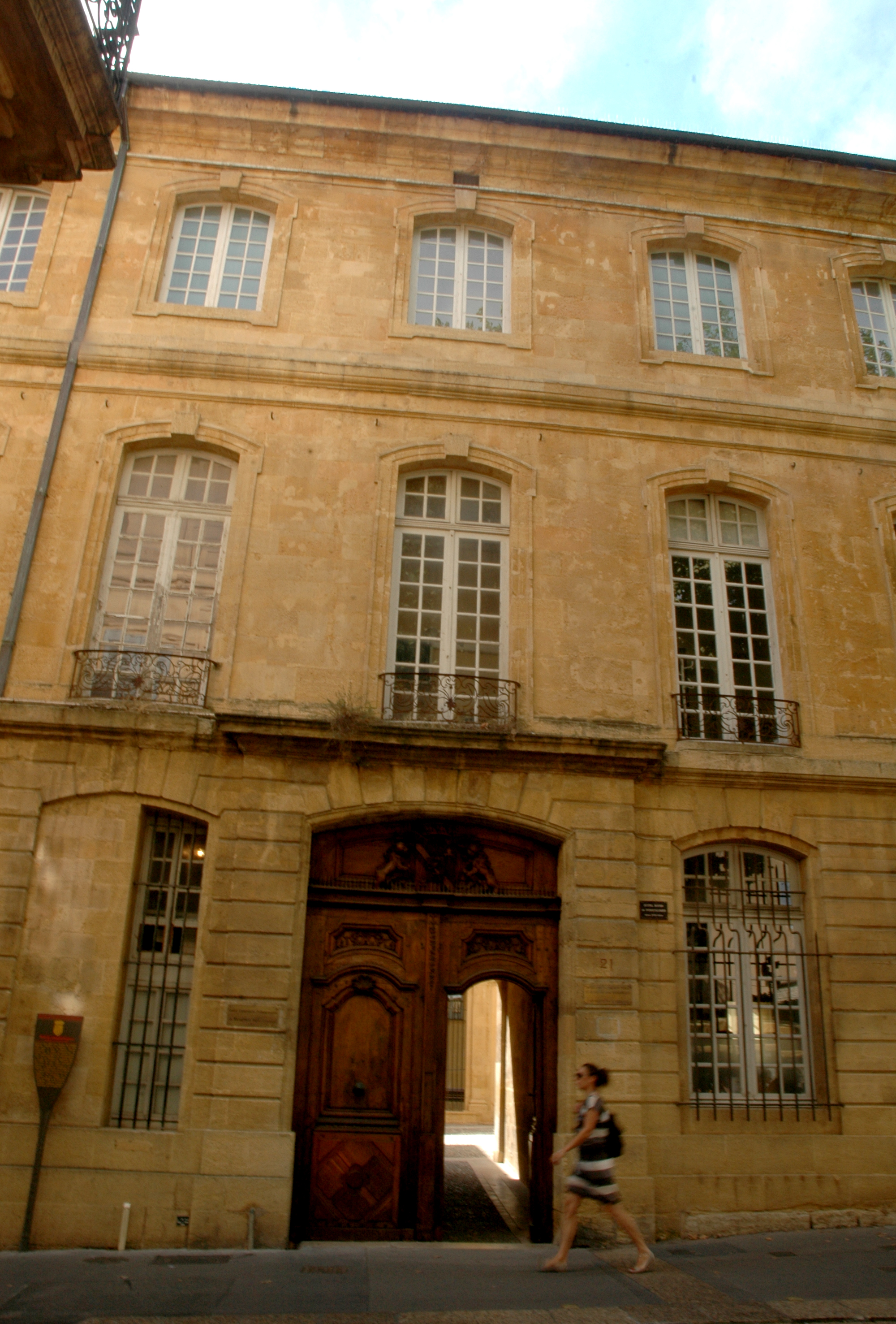
Hôtel Boyer de Fonscolombe

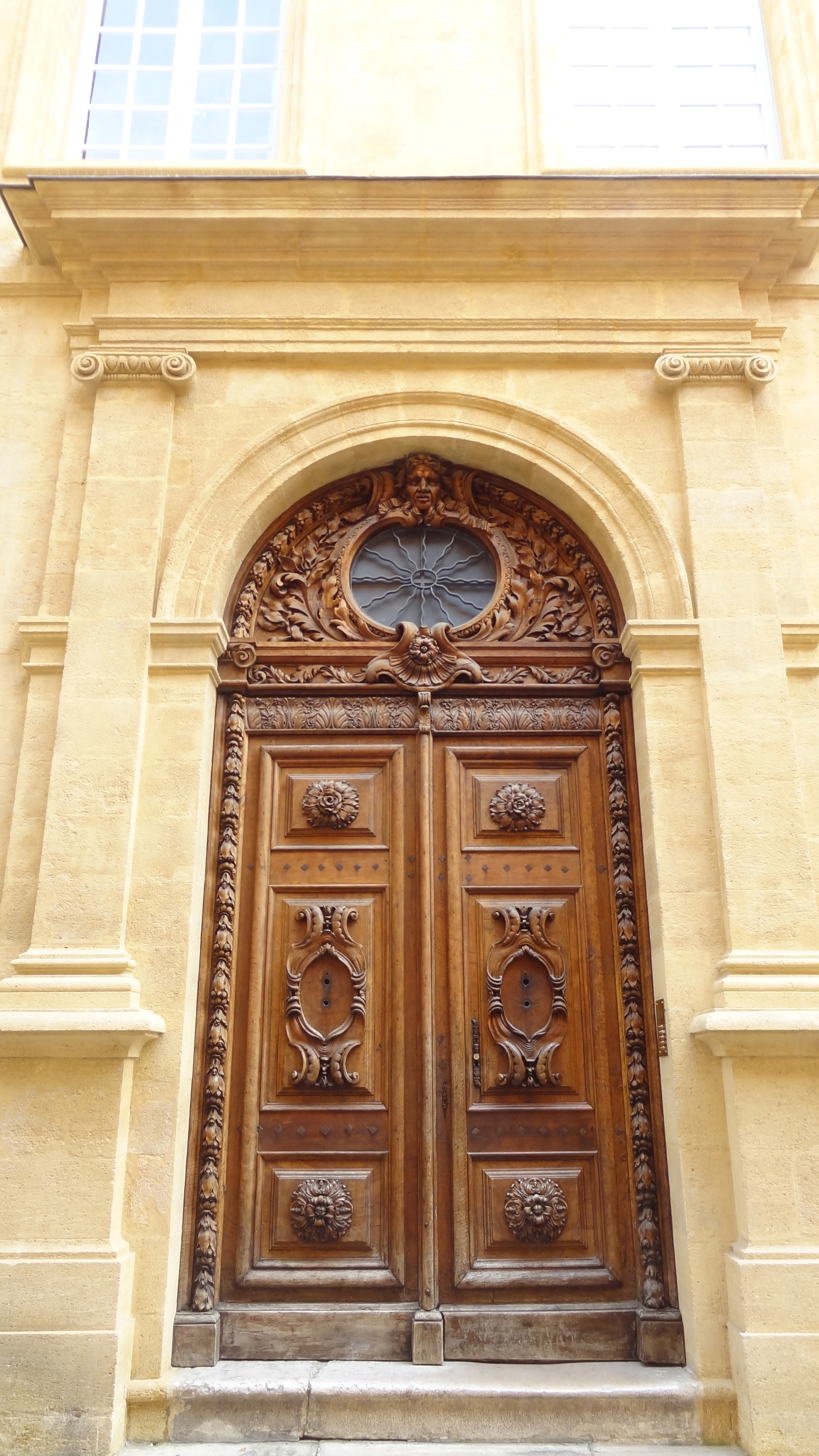
Hôtel de Grimaldi-Régusse

== Biography ==
=== Early life ===
Charles de Grimaldi-Régusse was born on August 10, 1612. His father was Pierre de Grimaldi and his mother, Suzanne de Laydet. His maternal grandfather was a parliamentary advisor to the Parlement of Aix-en-Provence. He was orphaned at the age of five and raised by his grandfather, Gaspard de Grimaldi, in La Ciotat. In 1630, his grandfather commissioned a building for him located at 18, rue Adolphe Abeille in La Ciotat (now demolished). He was educated in a Jesuit college in Avignon for eight years. He studied Law and received a Doctorate in Law on December 13, 1630.

=== Career ===
He served as parliamentary advisor to the Parlement of Aix-en-Provence in 1633, and as Président à mortier in 1643. In 1649, Régusse became a marquisate, and thus he became a significant landowner. He served as Commissioner to King Louis XIV at the Assembly in Aubagne in 1652.

However, he was exposed as a "rebel" to Louis XIV by Jean-Baptiste de Forbin-Maynier of Oppède (1648-1673), Président à mortier of the Parlement of Aix-en-Provence in 1673, and exiled in Issoudun for eleven months. Indeed, together with Antoine de Valbelle, he was opposed to taxes levied by the King, which contravened the taxes he and Antoine de Valbelle levied on merchants from Egypt (levying more taxes on those of Marseille than those of La Ciotat). In January 1660, King Louis XIV visited him at his private residence. However, he was exiled again from 1661 to 1664, this time in Abbeville.

According to the investigators of the time, the exile made him extremely bitter, causing him to begin the murder spree. His return in 1664 is considered to be the date of the start of his criminal actions.

=== Personal life ===
He married Marguerite de Napolon of Corsica. They had seven children:

- Françoise de Grimaldi-Régusse. She married Honoré Grimaldi.
- Gaspard de Grimaldi-Régusse (c. 1640 – 1700). He married Charlotte de Castillon de Beynes, daughter of Pierre and Lucrèce de Forbin. They had a son:
  - Charles II de Grimaldi-Régusse (1675–1741). He married Lucrèce d'Estienne-Chaussegros, daughter of Louis and Marguerite de Revilliasc. They had a son:
    - Charles-Louis-Sextius de Grimaldi-Régusse (1701-1784), first cousin of Gaspard-Joseph Chaussegros de Léry.
- Pierre (de Grimaldi-Régusse) de Moissac.
- Sauveur de Grimaldi-Régusse. He became an abbey.
- Charles de Grimaldi-Régusse. He became a Knight of Malta.
- Jeanne de Grimaldi-Régusse. She became a religious sister.
- Louise de Grimaldi-Régusse. She became a religious sister.

In 1635 and in 1642, he purchased two townhouses and converted them into the Hôtel Boyer de Fonscolombe, hôtel particulier located at 21 Rue Gaston de Saporta in Aix-en-Provence.

=== Killings, investigation ===
According to his own confession, the first murder happened June 21, 1664. His first target was François de Pierrefonds, Seigneur de Cernay. The victim was lured into the local mill during the night, then the victim was killed by a strike from a hammer. Charles then fled from the scene to his house, then he went to sleep. The hammer was left at the scene. The second murder happened at 12th of August of the same year, the target was Antoine de Clermont, Baron de Bury. The victim was lured to his own basement and killed with a single strike of a hammer. The hammer was taken by Charles this time. This has led the investigators to believe the perpetrator of these crimes may be the same person. The third murder happened at 15th of October, target was Henri de Vallon, Baron de Peyre. Charles attacked and killed them in the indoor theatre. Charles assumed nobody would be here because nobody was allowed to enter when there isn't a performance, but just a few minutes after the murder, the body was found by the performer group that was supposed to perform this day, exclusively for the Baron. The Mansion this happened in went on lockdown, and Charles was soon found with blood on his clothes, hiding in a barrel in the brewery. The hammer was found in the same barrel. Charles claimed that he had a nosebleed earlier, and that the hammer was already there when he went into the barrel, but during interrogation, he crumbled and confessed.

== Trial, execution ==
After the confession, he was tried in the local court, and found guilty on three counts of murder. He was burned at a stake on July 23, 1664.

== Bibliography ==
- Charles de Grimaldi marquis de Régusse, Mémoires de Charles de Grimaldi: marquis de Régusse, président au parlement d'Aix, Bordeaux: Presses Universitaires de Bordeaux, 2008, 158 pages.
