= Le Puy-Sainte-Réparade =

Commune in Provence-Alpes-Côte d'Azur, France

Le Puy-Sainte-Réparade Lo Pueg de Santa Reparada (Occitan)
- Commune
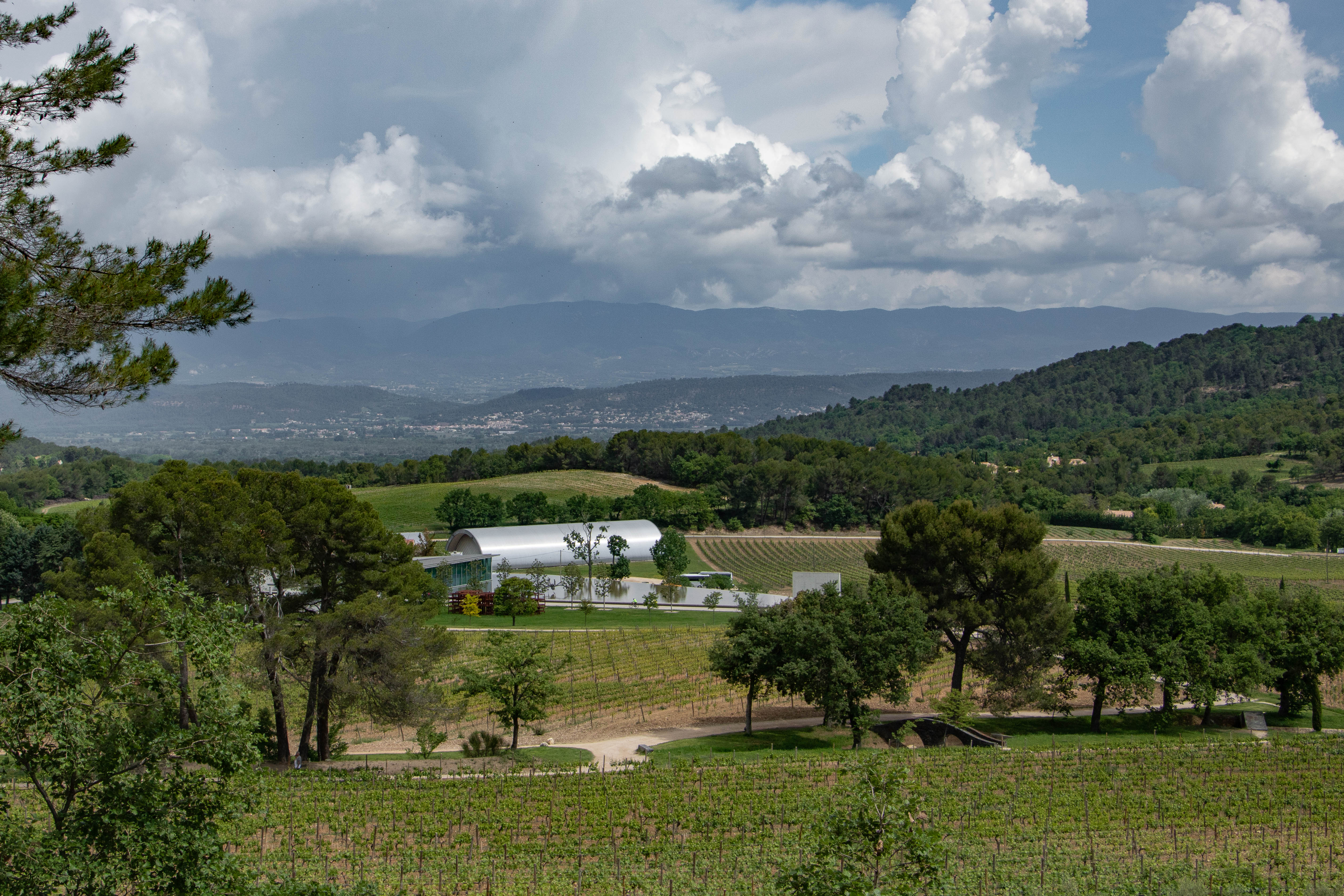
- A view of the Château La Coste vineyard

- Coat of arms
- Location of Le Puy-Sainte-Réparade
- Location within France Location within Provence-Alpes-Côte d'Azur
- Coordinates: 43°39′51″N 5°26′17″E
- Country: France
- Region: Provence-Alpes-Côte d'Azur
- Department: Bouches-du-Rhône
- Arrondissement: Aix-en-Provence
- Canton: Trets
- Intercommunality: Aix-Marseille-Provence

Government
  - Mayor (2026–32): Jean-David Ciot
- Area^{1}: 46.29 km^{2} (17.87 sq mi)
- Elevation: 196 m (643 ft)
- Highest elevation: 492 m (1,614 ft)
- Lowest elevation: 164 m (538 ft)
- Population (2023): 5,935
  - Density: 128.2/km^{2} (332.1/sq mi)
- Time zone: UTC+01:00 (CET)
  - Summer (DST): UTC+02:00 (CEST)
- INSEE/Postal code: 13080 /13610
- ^{1} French Land Register data, which excludes lakes, ponds, glaciers > 1 km^{2} (0.386 sq mi or 247 acres) and river estuaries.

Le Puy-Sainte-Réparade (French pronunciation: [lə pɥi sɛ̃t ʁepaʁad]; Occitan: Lo Pueg de Santa Reparada) or simply Le Puy is a commune in the Bouches-du-Rhône department in the Provence-Alpes-Côte d'Azur region in Southern France. It is located on the departmental border with Vaucluse, neighbouring Aix-en-Provence to the south and Pertuis to the northeast. It is part of the Aix-Marseille-Provence Metropolis.

== Toponym ==
Puy derives from the Provençal word "Puech", meaning an isolated hill.

"Sainte Réparade" is probably a corruption of "Sainte Réparate", patron saint of the diocese of Nice, some of whose relics were removed in the 11th century to the parish church of "Saint Maurice of Puy" which later took the name "Chapelle Sainte Réparade". According to legend, Saint Réparade was a young girl martyred in Caesarea during the reign of the Emperor Decius by a Roman Proconsul. Her body was laid in a boat and blown by the breath of angels to the bay now known as the Baie des Anges in Nice.

== Geography ==
Le Puy-Sainte-Réparade is located 15 km (9.3 mi) north of the Aix-en-Provence city centre via the N96 and then D561 roads.

It is located between the ridges of the Trévaresse and the river Durance which marks the natural boundary between the Vaucluse and Bouches-du-Rhône departments. Opposite Le Puy, on the other bank of the river, is Pertuis in the southern part of the Luberon natural region.

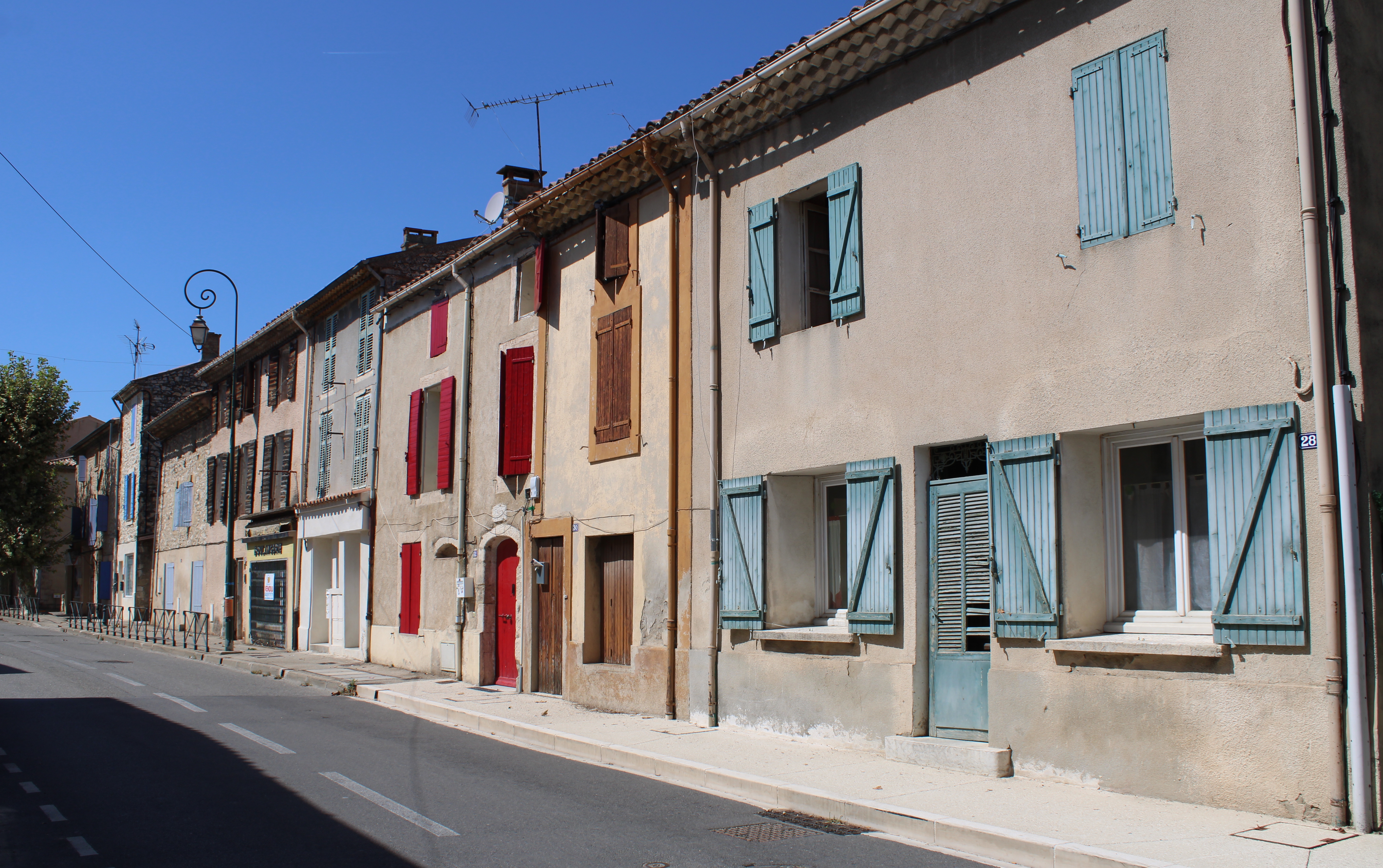
Street in the town centre

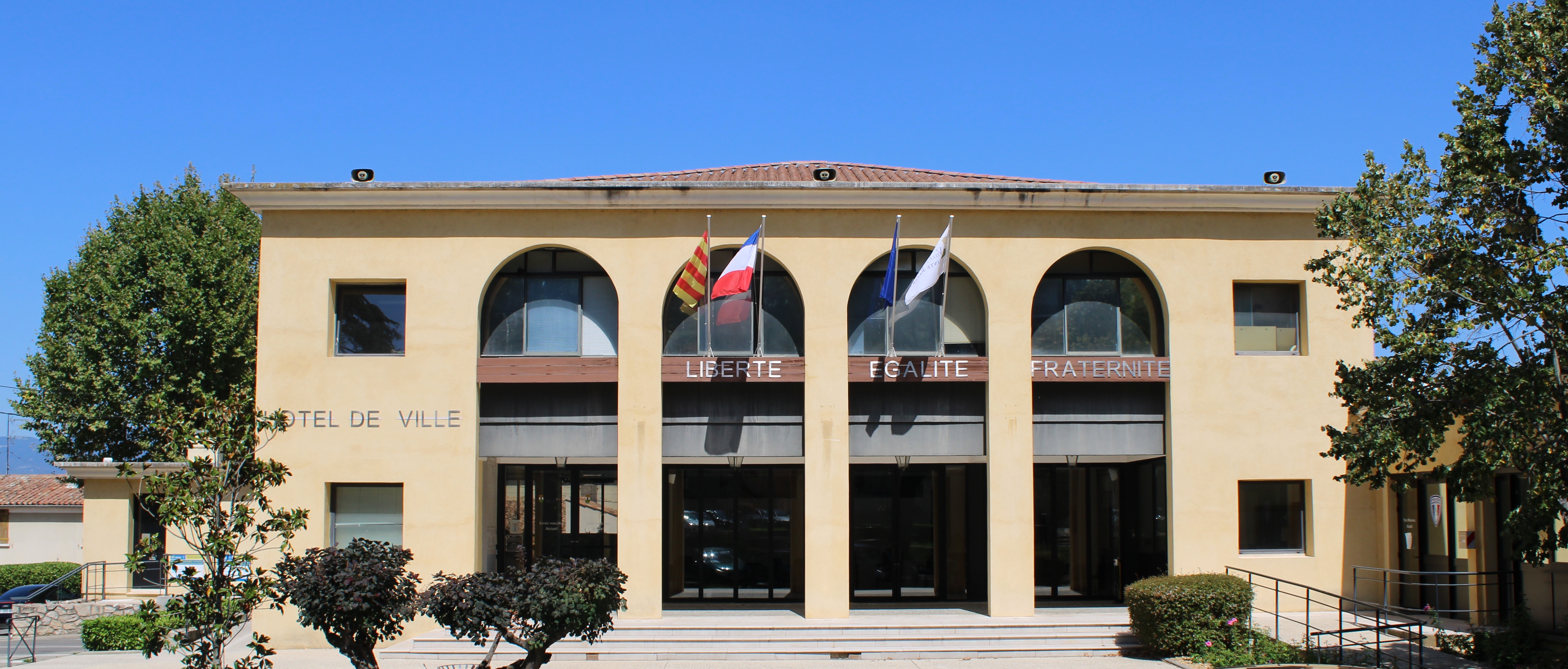
Le Puy-Sainte-Réparade Town Hall

The town is surrounded by vine fields and agricultural land, with arable crops on the plain and the vines on the hills. There is a renowned walk up to the Sainte-Réparade chapel; on arrival at the summit, there are panoramic views over the Durance plain, the Luberon and the Alpilles hills.

The nearby 450m hill La Quille (or La Quiho), "the keel", has the ruins of the 8th-century fortress, destroyed in the 17th century.

== History ==
Carved stones show that Le Puy was settled in Prehistoric times. The Celto Ligures Salluviens left traces during the Iron Age and there was subsequent settlement by the Romans.

In the 11th century, the Archbishops of Aix, who were lords of Puy, built a fortified château and acquired neighbouring lands. In 1155, Pons de Lubières bought his Puy estates from Hugues d'Eguilles. In 1212, Gui de Fos bequeathed goods to the Archbishop and chapter. In 1268, the chapter of Aix gave the church of Puy to the Archbishop Vicedominis.

Around 1510, Le Puy suffered the Plague.

The fortress of La Quiho has been taken several times, first by Raymond de Turenne, Captain of the Arms of the Comtat Venaissin, in 1391. Then in 1578, during the wars of religion, it was besieged for nearly three months, before it was captured on 7 January 1579 by the lieutenants of the Count of Carcès, Gaspard de Pontevès, seneschal of Provence. It was taken again in 1591 by the Duke of Savoy and was eventually destroyed in 1612 by order of the Parliament of Provence.

== Administration ==
List of successive mayors
Term	Name	Notes
1953–2000	Joachim Durand	
1953–2000	Louis Philibert	Served in the National Assembly (1962–1986) and Senate (1989–1998)
2000–2001	Nicolas Nicolaou	
2001–2008	Jean-Pierre Bertrand	
2008–present	Jean-David Ciot	Served in the National Assembly (2012–2017)

== Demographics ==
Historical population
Year	Pop.	±% p.a.
1968	2,569	—
1975	2,859	+1.54%
1982	3,079	+1.06%
1990	4,414	+4.61%
1999	4,813	+0.97%
2007	5,119	+0.77%
2012	5,379	+1.00%
2017	5,719	+1.23%
2023	5,935	+0.62%
Source: INSEE

== Churches ==
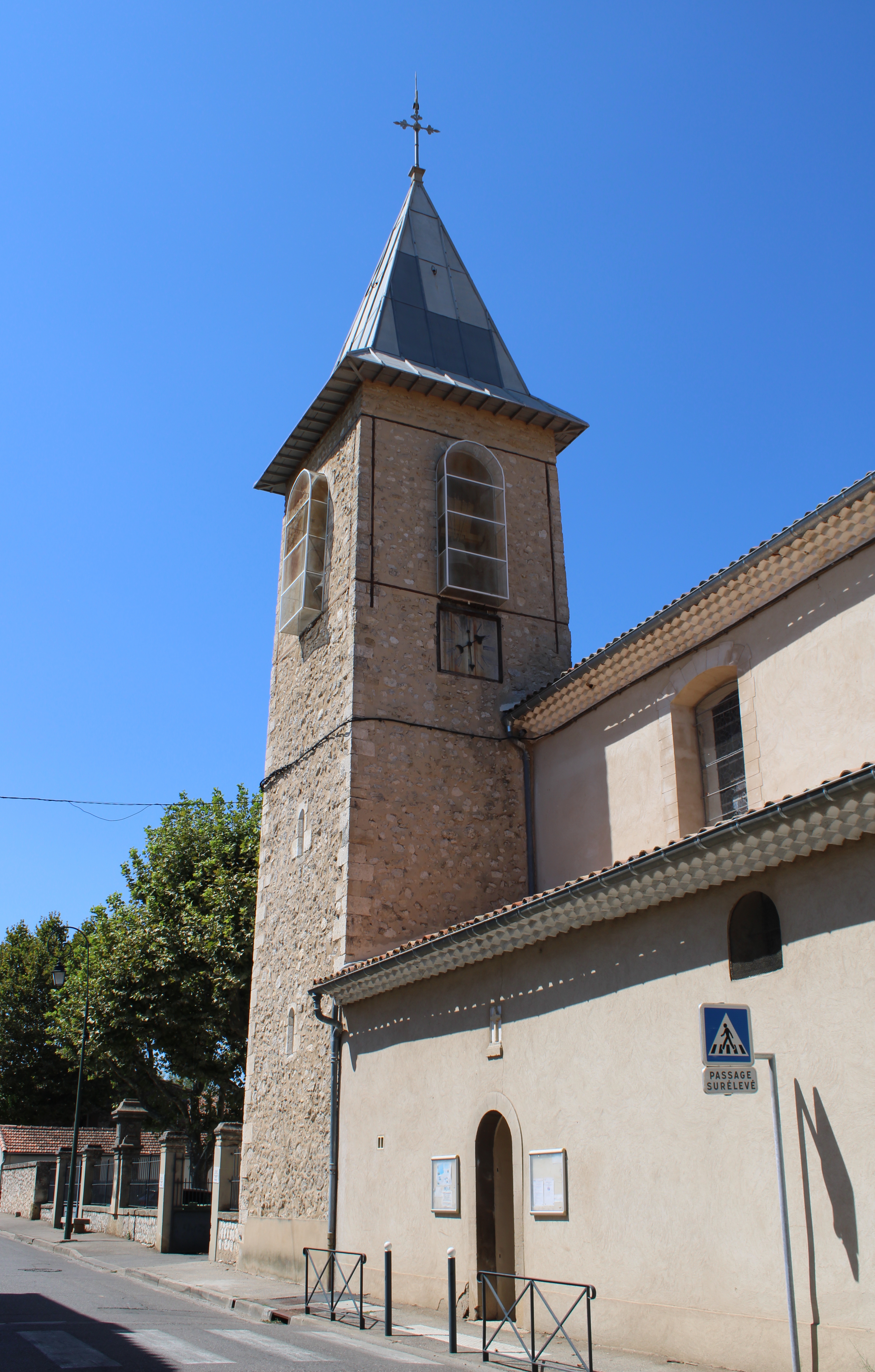
Church

The Sainte-Réparade chapel was built in the 10th or 11th century (restored in 1677, later in 1975). A procession to it takes place on the saint's feast day, 8 October.

The parish church of Sainte-Marie is from the 18th century.

== Vineyards ==
There are four vineyards in the area:

- Château de Fonscolombe, also a Relais & Châteaux hotel
- Château La Coste
- Château Paradis
- Domaine Les Bastides

== See also ==
- Communes of the Bouches-du-Rhône department
