= Château La Coste =

Monumental sculptures from Erich Engelbrecht

Chateau La Coste
- Location within France
- Location: 15 km (9.3 mi) north of Aix-en-Provence, Provence, France
- Coordinates: 43.6359°N 5.4198°E
- Collections: 500 acres (200 ha) of vineyards and sculpture park
- Website: chateau-la-coste.com

Château La Coste is a 600-acre sculpture park, art destination and organic winery in Provence. The property includes Villa La Coste a luxury hotel The sculpture park contains art and architecture by Tadao Ando, Louise Bourgeois, Bob Dylan, Tracey Emin, André Fu, Frank Gehry, Andy Goldsworthy, Christopher Green, Kengo Kuma, Paul Matisse, Oscar Niemeyer, Jean Nouvel, Renzo Piano, Richard Rogers, Richard Serra, Conrad Shawcross, Lee Ufan, Ai Weiwei and Franz West. Irish property magnate Paddy McKillen is the estate owner and project manager of the hotel. Wine varietals of the estate include Syrah, Cabernet Sauvignon and Vermentino.

== See also ==
List of sculpture parks
