= Jean-Pancrace Chastel =

French sculptor

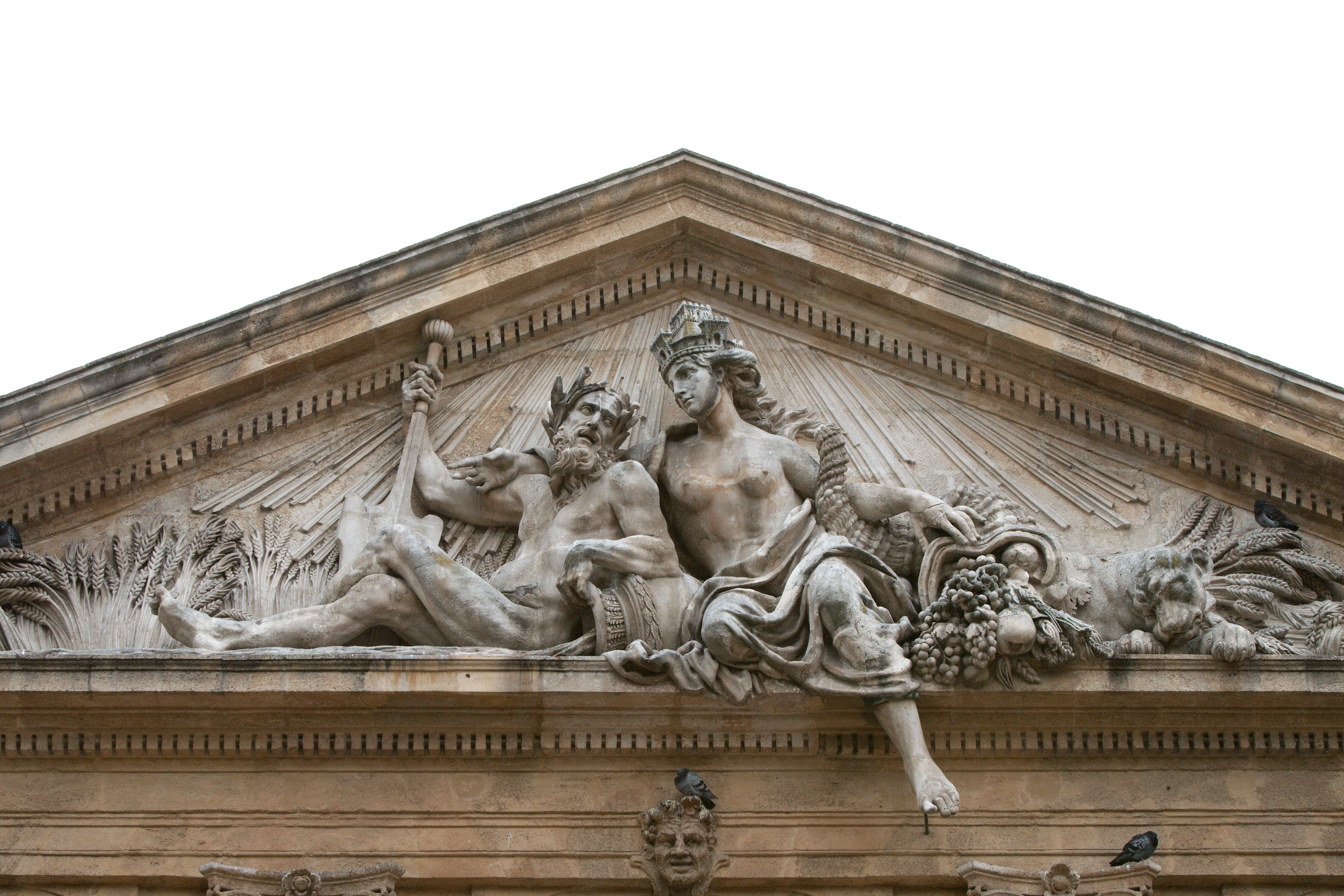
Sculpture on top of the former Corn Exchange in Aix-en-Provence

Jean-Pancrace Chastel (1726–1793) was a French sculptor.

== Biography ==
=== Early life ===
He was born in Avignon in 1726 and moved to Aix-en-Provence as a young boy.

=== Career ===
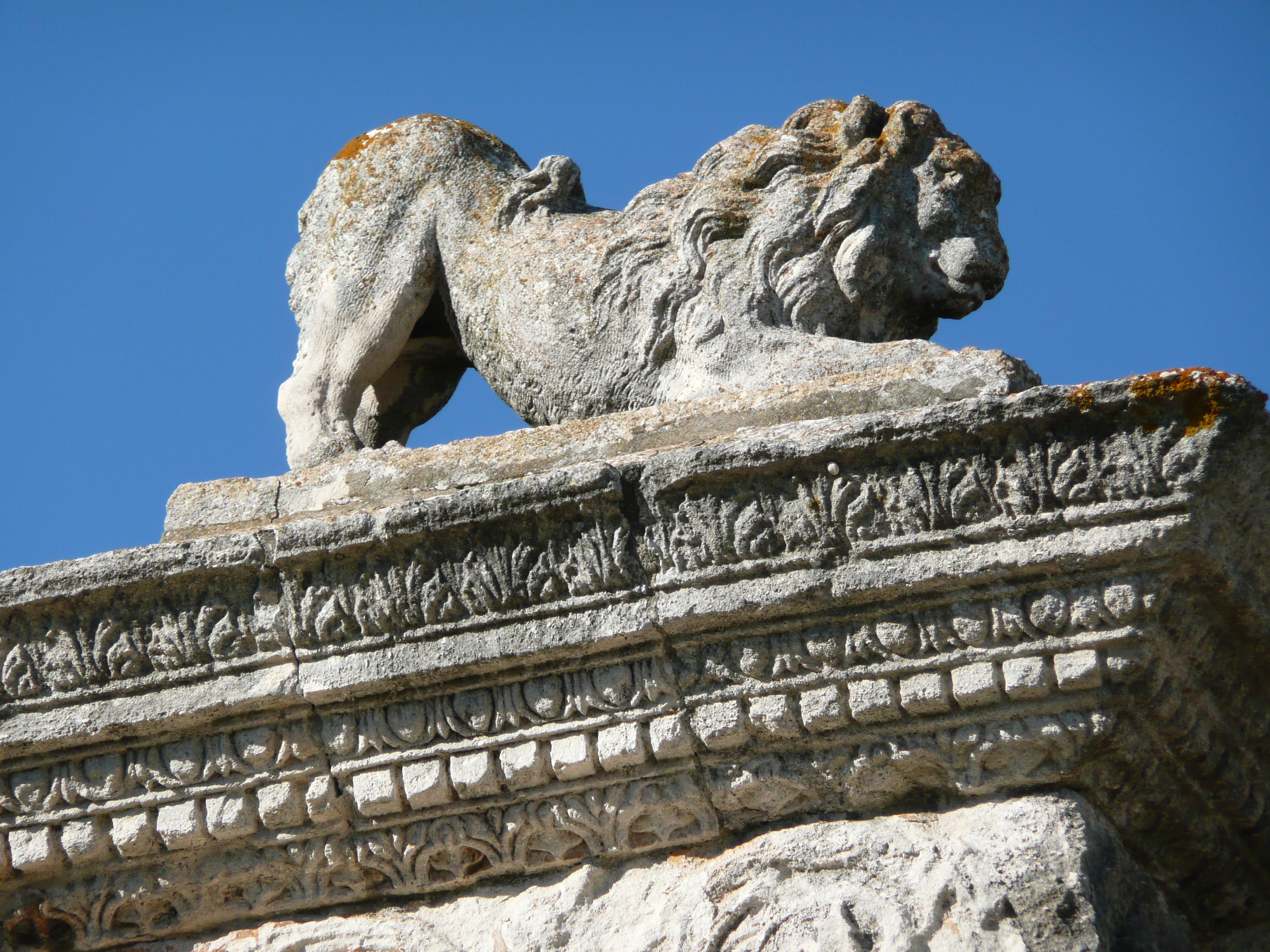
Sculpture of a lion

He was the first professor to teach at the School of Sculpture in Aix-en-Provence, founded in 1774.

He sculpted three fountains in Aix-en-Provence: Mule-Noir, Prêcheurs (1748) and Tanneurs (1761). He also sculpted the top of the former Corn Exchange. Some of his sculptures can be found in the Musée Granet.

=== Personal life ===
He married twice, and had a son. He died in poverty in a hospice in Aix-en-Provence.

== Legacy ==
The Rue Jean Pancrace Chastel in Avignon is named in his honor.

== Bibliography ==
- Serge Conard, Jean-Pancrace Chastel: approche de l'oeuvre, Université, 1973, 230 pages.
