= Antoine de Saporta =

French aristocrat and non-fiction writer

- Born: 26 July 1855; Aix-en-Provence, Bouches-du-Rhône, Provence-Alpes-Côte d'Azur, France
- Died: 14 April 1914 (aged 58); Montpellier, Hérault, Languedoc-Roussillon, France
- Occupation: Writer
- Parent(s): Gaston de Saporta; Valentine de Forbin la Barben

Antoine de Saporta (26 July 1855 – 14 April 1914) was a French aristocrat and non-fiction writer.

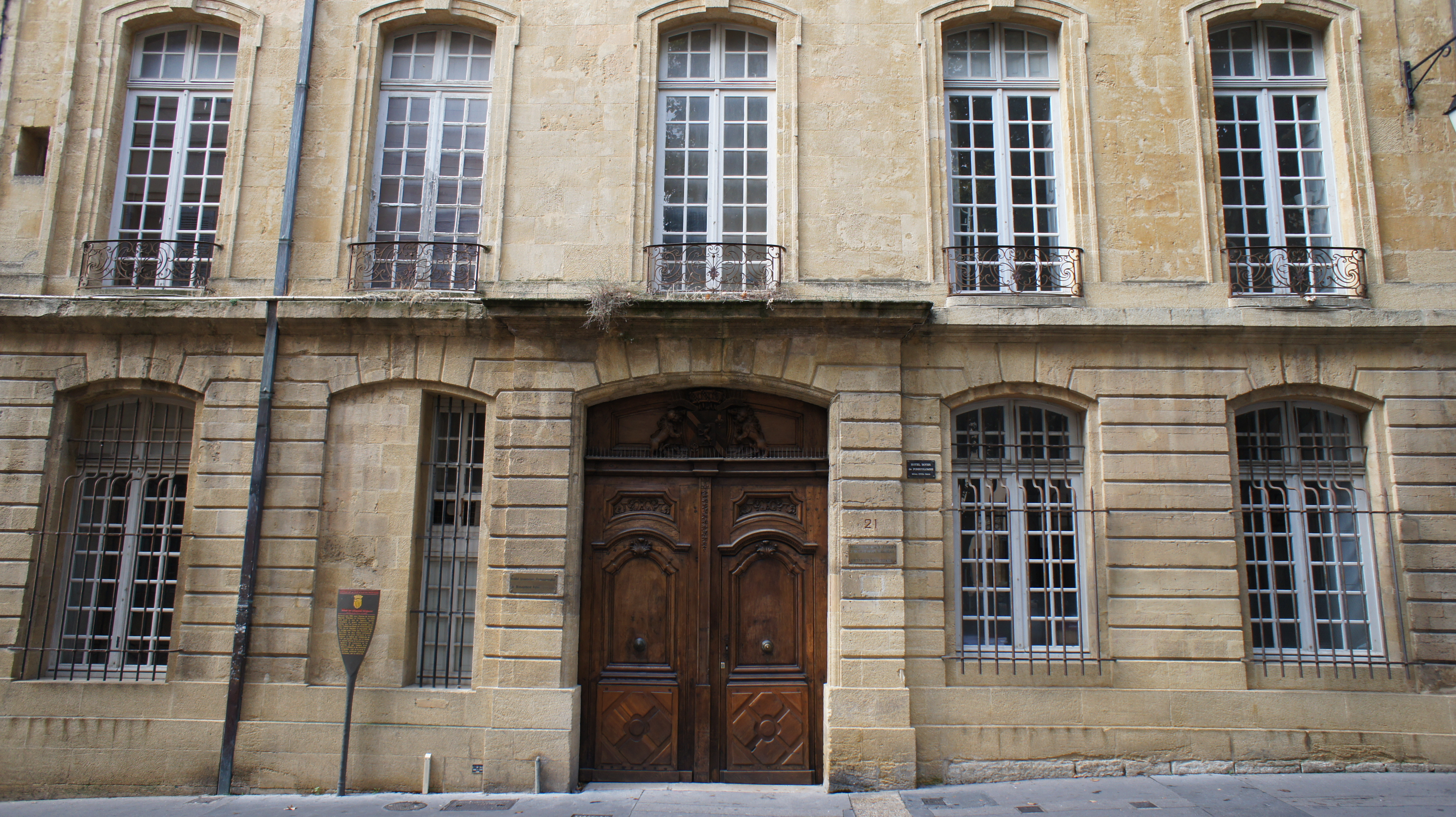
Hôtel Boyer de Fonscolombe in Aix-en-Provence

== Biography ==
=== Early life ===
Antoine de Saporta was born on July 26, 1855, in Aix-en-Provence. He was a member of the Provençal nobility. His father, Gaston de Saporta (1823-1895), was a renowned botanist. He grew up in the Hôtel Boyer de Fonscolombe, a listed hôtel particulier at 21 Rue Gaston de Saporta in Aix-en-Provence.

=== Career ===
He wrote several books, mostly about wine. He also wrote many articles for La Nature, La Revue scientifique and Revue des deux Mondes.

=== Death ===
He died on April 14, 1914, in Montpellier.

== Bibliography ==
- Aurores boréales (1885).
- La Chimie des vins : les vins naturels, les vins manipulés et falsifiés (1889).
- Les Théories et les notations de la chimie moderne (1889).
- Le Congrès viticole de Montpellier (1893).
- La Vigne et le vin dans le midi de la France (1894).
- Physique et chimie viticoles (1899).
- Traité de viticulture théorie et pratique (1899).
- Les corps simples de la chimie.
- Les Artifices de toilette, les fards. Cheveux teints et postiches. Les artifices de toilette sur la scène.
