= Gaston de Saporta =

French aristocrat, palaeobotanist and non-fiction writer

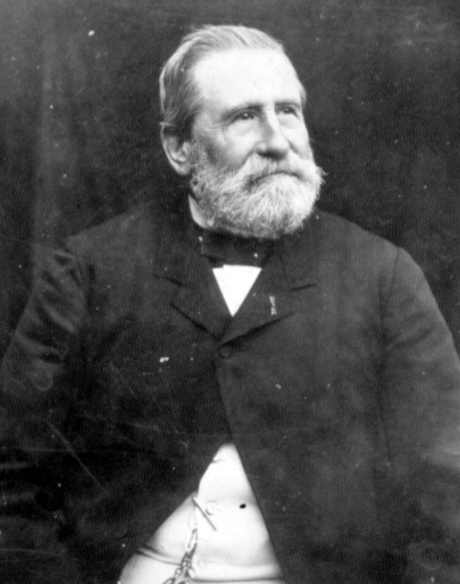
- Born: 28 July 1823; Château de Montvert, Saint-Zacharie, Var, Kingdom of France
- Died: 26 January 1895 (aged 71); Aix-en-Provence, Bouches-du-Rhône, France
- Occupation: Botanist
- Spouses: Valentine de Forbin la Barben; Émilie de Gabrielli de Gubbio
- Children: Antoine de Saporta
- Parent(s): Adolphe Charles François Anne de Saporta; Irène Boyer de Fonscolombe de La Mole

Gaston de Saporta (28 July 1823 – 26 January 1895) was a French aristocrat, palaeobotanist and non-fiction writer.

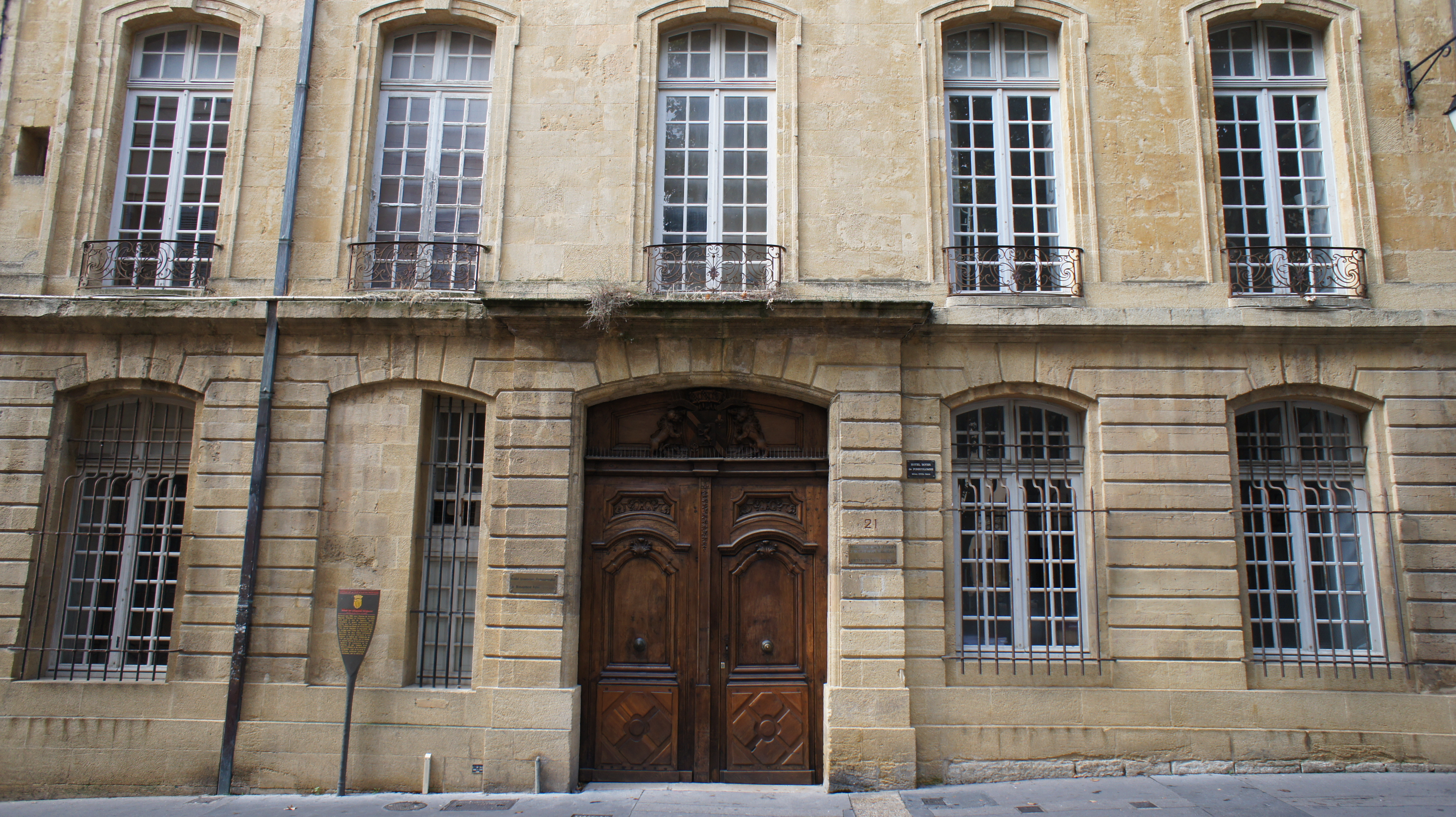
Hôtel Boyer de Fonscolombe in Aix-en-Provence

== Biography ==
=== Early life ===
(Louis Charles Joseph) Gaston de Saporta born in the Château de Montvert in Saint-Zacharie, Var, on July 28, 1823. He was a member of the Provençal nobility. His father was Adolphe Charles François Anne de Saporta (1800–1879) and his mother, Irène Boyer de Fonscolombe de La Mole (1799–1879). He grew up in the Hôtel Boyer de Fonscolombe, a listed hôtel particulier at 21 Rue Gaston de Saporta in Aix-en-Provence, where he resided all his life.

=== Career ===
As a palaeobotanist, he was a supporter of Charles Darwin's theory of evolution and showed the transformation of plant species in different eras. He corresponded with Darwin. In 1877, Darwin wrote a supportive letter to Saporta which stated that "your idea that dicotyledonous plants were not developed in force until sucking insects had been evolved seems to me a splendid one."

He wrote many books about botany from the 1860s to the 1890s. He became a member of the French Academy of Sciences. Moreover, he often visited the National Museum of Natural History in Paris to attend conferences, and paved the way for the inauguration of the Museum of Natural History in Aix-en-Provence. The Marquis de.Saporta, was elected to honorary membership of the Manchester Literary and Philosophical Society, in 1892.

Interested in the aristocracy, he also wrote a book about the family of Marie de Rabutin-Chantal, marquise de Sévigné (1626–1696).

=== Fossil Plants of Portugal ===
He was the author of the study of the fossil plants collected by Paul Choffat in the Portuguese Mesozoic, which made it possible to determine the age of the respective soils. His work the discovery of dicotyledonous species in the Lower Cretaceous of Cercal (Ourém) stands out, suggesting that the origin of this group was in Portugal. He often described numerous Mesozoic deposits for the first time, including Anadia, Paço (Sangalhos), Raposeira, Vacariça, Cabanas de Torres, Moita dos Ferreiros (Lourinhã), Buarcos (Figueira da Foz) and Alcântara (Lisbon). In a single article from 1894 entitled "Flore fossile du Portugal - Nouvelles contributions à la flore mésozoïque", Saporta described an impressive number of new plant taxa for the Mesozoic of Portugal. In what was one of the scientific articles with the most species named, he described four new genera - Delgadopsis, Choffatia, Phlebomeris and Ravenalospermum - based on Portuguese holotypes, and 265 new species, making him the most prolific paleontologist in terms of the number of new taxa from Portugal.

=== Personal life ===
He was married to Valentine de Forbin la Barben. He was widowed in 1850, and got remarried to Émilie de Gabrielli de Gubbio. They had a son, Antoine de Saporta (1855–1914), who became a writer.

He died in Aix-en-Provence on January 26, 1895.

== Legacy ==
Several taxa have been named in his honour, for example Pistacia x saportae, a hybrid shrub growing in the Mediterranean zone, or Saportanthus, a fossil lauralean flower from the Early Cretaceous of Portugal.

The Rue Gaston de Saporta in Aix-en-Provence is named in his honour.

== Bibliography ==
- Sur le rôle des végétaux à feuilles caduques dans les flores tertiaires antérieures au miocène proprement dit et spécialement dans celle du gypse d'Aix (1863)
- Notice sur les plantes fossiles des calcaires concrétionnés de Brognon (Côte-d'Or) (1866)
- La Flore des tufs quaternaires en Provence (1867)
- Caractères de l'ancienne végétation polaire : analyse raisonnée de l'ouvrage de M. Oswald Heer intitulé Flora fossilis Artica (1868)
- La Végétation du Globe dans les temps antérieurs à l'homme (1868)
- La Paléontologie appliquée à l'étude des races humaines (1868)
- Prodrome d'une flore fossile des travertins anciens de Sézanne (1868)
- Le Phénomène de la vie, discours prononcé à la séance publique annuelle de l'Académie des sciences, agriculture, arts et belles-lettres d'Aix (1870)
- Études sur la végétation du sud-est de la France à l'époque tertiaire : révision de la flore des gypses d'Aix (1872)
- Flore fossile du Portugal
- Essai sur l'état de la végétation à l'époque des marnes heersiennes de Gelinden (with Antoine-Fortuné Marion, 1873)
- Paléontologie française, ou Description des fossiles de la France, commencée par Alcide d'Orbigny et continuée par une réunion de paléontologistes. 2e série : Végétaux. Plantes jurassiques (6 volumes, 1873–1884)
- Notice sur les plantes fossiles du niveau des lits à poissons de Cerin (1873)
- Examen critique d'une collection de plantes fossiles de Koumi (Eubée) (1873)
- Recherches sur les végétaux fossiles de Meximieux (with Antoine-Fortuné Marion, 1876)
- Les Anciens climats de l'Europe et le développement de la végétation (1878)
- Essai descriptif sur les plantes fossiles des Arkosses de Brives près le Puy-en-Velay (1878)
- Révision de la flore heersienne de Gelinden, d'après une collection appartenant au Cte de Looz (with Antoine-Fortuné Marion, 1878)
- Le Monde des plantes avant l'apparition de l'homme (1879)
- Les Temps quaternaires (1881)
- Aperçu géologique du terroir d'Aix-en-Provence (1881)
- L'Évolution du règne végétal (3 volumes, 1881–1885)
- À propos des algues Jossiles (1882)
- La Formation de la houille (1882)
- Un essai de synthèse paléoethnique (1883)
- Les Organismes problématiques des anciennes mers (1884)
- Origine paléontologique des arbres cultivés ou utilisés par l'homme (1888)
- Dernières adjonctions à la flore fossile d'Aix-en-Provence, précédées de Notions stratigraphiques et paléontologiques appliquées à l'étude du gisement des plantes fossiles d'Aix-en-Provence (1889)
- La Famille de Mme de Sévigné en Provence (1889)
- Recherches sur la végétation du niveau Aquinien de Manosque (1891)
- Correspondance entre Charles Darwin et Gaston de Saporta, précédée de Histoire de la paléobotanique en France au XIXe siècle par Yvette Conry (Paris : Presses universitaires de France, 1972, posthumous).
